

334001–334100 

|-bgcolor=#E9E9E9
| 334001 ||  || — || October 1, 2000 || Socorro || LINEAR || — || align=right | 1.4 km || 
|-id=002 bgcolor=#E9E9E9
| 334002 ||  || — || October 25, 2000 || Socorro || LINEAR || — || align=right | 1.3 km || 
|-id=003 bgcolor=#E9E9E9
| 334003 ||  || — || October 24, 2000 || Socorro || LINEAR || — || align=right data-sort-value="0.89" | 890 m || 
|-id=004 bgcolor=#E9E9E9
| 334004 ||  || — || October 24, 2000 || Socorro || LINEAR || — || align=right data-sort-value="0.94" | 940 m || 
|-id=005 bgcolor=#E9E9E9
| 334005 ||  || — || October 24, 2000 || Socorro || LINEAR || — || align=right | 1.9 km || 
|-id=006 bgcolor=#E9E9E9
| 334006 ||  || — || October 24, 2000 || Socorro || LINEAR || — || align=right | 1.2 km || 
|-id=007 bgcolor=#E9E9E9
| 334007 ||  || — || October 25, 2000 || Socorro || LINEAR || — || align=right data-sort-value="0.94" | 940 m || 
|-id=008 bgcolor=#E9E9E9
| 334008 ||  || — || October 25, 2000 || Socorro || LINEAR || — || align=right | 1.0 km || 
|-id=009 bgcolor=#E9E9E9
| 334009 ||  || — || October 25, 2000 || Socorro || LINEAR || — || align=right | 1.7 km || 
|-id=010 bgcolor=#E9E9E9
| 334010 ||  || — || October 25, 2000 || Socorro || LINEAR || — || align=right | 1.3 km || 
|-id=011 bgcolor=#E9E9E9
| 334011 ||  || — || October 24, 2000 || Socorro || LINEAR || — || align=right | 1.6 km || 
|-id=012 bgcolor=#FA8072
| 334012 ||  || — || November 1, 2000 || Socorro || LINEAR || — || align=right | 1.4 km || 
|-id=013 bgcolor=#fefefe
| 334013 ||  || — || November 1, 2000 || Socorro || LINEAR || NYS || align=right data-sort-value="0.90" | 900 m || 
|-id=014 bgcolor=#E9E9E9
| 334014 ||  || — || November 1, 2000 || Socorro || LINEAR || — || align=right | 3.0 km || 
|-id=015 bgcolor=#E9E9E9
| 334015 ||  || — || November 2, 2000 || Socorro || LINEAR || — || align=right | 1.2 km || 
|-id=016 bgcolor=#E9E9E9
| 334016 ||  || — || November 3, 2000 || Socorro || LINEAR || — || align=right | 1.0 km || 
|-id=017 bgcolor=#E9E9E9
| 334017 ||  || — || November 19, 2000 || Socorro || LINEAR || — || align=right | 1.2 km || 
|-id=018 bgcolor=#E9E9E9
| 334018 ||  || — || November 23, 2000 || Kitt Peak || Spacewatch || EUN || align=right | 2.1 km || 
|-id=019 bgcolor=#E9E9E9
| 334019 ||  || — || November 25, 2000 || Kitt Peak || Spacewatch || KON || align=right | 2.8 km || 
|-id=020 bgcolor=#E9E9E9
| 334020 ||  || — || November 21, 2000 || Socorro || LINEAR || — || align=right | 1.4 km || 
|-id=021 bgcolor=#E9E9E9
| 334021 ||  || — || November 18, 2000 || Desert Eagle || W. K. Y. Yeung || — || align=right | 1.3 km || 
|-id=022 bgcolor=#E9E9E9
| 334022 ||  || — || November 21, 2000 || Socorro || LINEAR || — || align=right | 1.2 km || 
|-id=023 bgcolor=#E9E9E9
| 334023 ||  || — || November 20, 2000 || Socorro || LINEAR || — || align=right | 1.8 km || 
|-id=024 bgcolor=#E9E9E9
| 334024 ||  || — || November 20, 2000 || Anderson Mesa || LONEOS || JUN || align=right | 1.3 km || 
|-id=025 bgcolor=#E9E9E9
| 334025 ||  || — || November 21, 2000 || Socorro || LINEAR || JUN || align=right | 1.3 km || 
|-id=026 bgcolor=#E9E9E9
| 334026 ||  || — || December 3, 2000 || Haleakala || NEAT || — || align=right | 1.2 km || 
|-id=027 bgcolor=#E9E9E9
| 334027 ||  || — || December 4, 2000 || Socorro || LINEAR || — || align=right | 2.8 km || 
|-id=028 bgcolor=#FA8072
| 334028 ||  || — || December 5, 2000 || Socorro || LINEAR || — || align=right data-sort-value="0.87" | 870 m || 
|-id=029 bgcolor=#E9E9E9
| 334029 ||  || — || December 5, 2000 || Socorro || LINEAR || — || align=right | 4.3 km || 
|-id=030 bgcolor=#fefefe
| 334030 ||  || — || December 15, 2000 || Socorro || LINEAR || — || align=right | 1.5 km || 
|-id=031 bgcolor=#E9E9E9
| 334031 ||  || — || December 29, 2000 || Haleakala || NEAT || — || align=right | 1.1 km || 
|-id=032 bgcolor=#E9E9E9
| 334032 ||  || — || December 30, 2000 || Socorro || LINEAR || ADE || align=right | 3.0 km || 
|-id=033 bgcolor=#E9E9E9
| 334033 ||  || — || December 30, 2000 || Socorro || LINEAR || JUN || align=right | 1.2 km || 
|-id=034 bgcolor=#E9E9E9
| 334034 ||  || — || December 31, 2000 || Anderson Mesa || LONEOS || — || align=right | 1.9 km || 
|-id=035 bgcolor=#E9E9E9
| 334035 ||  || — || January 3, 2001 || Socorro || LINEAR || MAR || align=right | 2.0 km || 
|-id=036 bgcolor=#E9E9E9
| 334036 ||  || — || January 4, 2001 || Socorro || LINEAR || EUN || align=right | 2.3 km || 
|-id=037 bgcolor=#E9E9E9
| 334037 ||  || — || January 26, 2001 || Socorro || LINEAR || — || align=right | 3.2 km || 
|-id=038 bgcolor=#FA8072
| 334038 ||  || — || February 3, 2001 || Socorro || LINEAR || — || align=right | 1.6 km || 
|-id=039 bgcolor=#fefefe
| 334039 ||  || — || February 15, 2001 || Socorro || LINEAR || PHO || align=right | 1.5 km || 
|-id=040 bgcolor=#E9E9E9
| 334040 ||  || — || February 17, 2001 || Socorro || LINEAR || — || align=right | 2.6 km || 
|-id=041 bgcolor=#fefefe
| 334041 ||  || — || February 19, 2001 || Socorro || LINEAR || — || align=right | 1.5 km || 
|-id=042 bgcolor=#FA8072
| 334042 ||  || — || March 14, 2001 || Anderson Mesa || LONEOS || — || align=right data-sort-value="0.65" | 650 m || 
|-id=043 bgcolor=#fefefe
| 334043 ||  || — || March 19, 2001 || Socorro || LINEAR || — || align=right | 1.0 km || 
|-id=044 bgcolor=#FA8072
| 334044 ||  || — || March 19, 2001 || Haleakala || NEAT || — || align=right | 4.3 km || 
|-id=045 bgcolor=#fefefe
| 334045 ||  || — || May 19, 2001 || Bergisch Gladbach || W. Bickel || — || align=right data-sort-value="0.82" | 820 m || 
|-id=046 bgcolor=#fefefe
| 334046 ||  || — || May 26, 2001 || Kitt Peak || Spacewatch || — || align=right data-sort-value="0.94" | 940 m || 
|-id=047 bgcolor=#d6d6d6
| 334047 ||  || — || June 13, 2001 || Desert Beaver || W. K. Y. Yeung || — || align=right | 3.9 km || 
|-id=048 bgcolor=#E9E9E9
| 334048 ||  || — || June 14, 2001 || Palomar || NEAT || BRG || align=right | 2.7 km || 
|-id=049 bgcolor=#d6d6d6
| 334049 ||  || — || June 23, 2001 || Palomar || NEAT || — || align=right | 3.9 km || 
|-id=050 bgcolor=#d6d6d6
| 334050 ||  || — || July 12, 2001 || Palomar || NEAT || EUP || align=right | 9.1 km || 
|-id=051 bgcolor=#fefefe
| 334051 ||  || — || July 14, 2001 || Palomar || NEAT || — || align=right data-sort-value="0.93" | 930 m || 
|-id=052 bgcolor=#fefefe
| 334052 ||  || — || July 19, 2001 || Palomar || NEAT || — || align=right data-sort-value="0.91" | 910 m || 
|-id=053 bgcolor=#d6d6d6
| 334053 ||  || — || July 19, 2001 || Palomar || NEAT || EUP || align=right | 6.8 km || 
|-id=054 bgcolor=#fefefe
| 334054 ||  || — || July 18, 2001 || Palomar || NEAT || V || align=right | 1.2 km || 
|-id=055 bgcolor=#FA8072
| 334055 ||  || — || July 21, 2001 || Anderson Mesa || LONEOS || — || align=right | 1.2 km || 
|-id=056 bgcolor=#d6d6d6
| 334056 ||  || — || July 18, 2001 || Palomar || NEAT || EUP || align=right | 3.9 km || 
|-id=057 bgcolor=#FA8072
| 334057 ||  || — || July 16, 2001 || Anderson Mesa || LONEOS || — || align=right | 1.4 km || 
|-id=058 bgcolor=#fefefe
| 334058 ||  || — || July 21, 2001 || Haleakala || NEAT || CIM || align=right | 3.0 km || 
|-id=059 bgcolor=#fefefe
| 334059 ||  || — || July 30, 2001 || Palomar || NEAT || H || align=right | 1.3 km || 
|-id=060 bgcolor=#fefefe
| 334060 ||  || — || July 22, 2001 || Palomar || NEAT || — || align=right | 1.1 km || 
|-id=061 bgcolor=#d6d6d6
| 334061 ||  || — || July 31, 2001 || Palomar || NEAT || — || align=right | 4.7 km || 
|-id=062 bgcolor=#d6d6d6
| 334062 ||  || — || July 27, 2001 || Palomar || NEAT || ALA || align=right | 4.7 km || 
|-id=063 bgcolor=#fefefe
| 334063 ||  || — || August 3, 2001 || Haleakala || NEAT || — || align=right data-sort-value="0.95" | 950 m || 
|-id=064 bgcolor=#fefefe
| 334064 ||  || — || August 9, 2001 || Palomar || NEAT || NYS || align=right data-sort-value="0.79" | 790 m || 
|-id=065 bgcolor=#d6d6d6
| 334065 ||  || — || August 12, 2001 || Palomar || NEAT || — || align=right | 4.3 km || 
|-id=066 bgcolor=#d6d6d6
| 334066 ||  || — || August 9, 2001 || Palomar || NEAT || — || align=right | 4.8 km || 
|-id=067 bgcolor=#fefefe
| 334067 ||  || — || August 9, 2001 || Palomar || NEAT || PHO || align=right | 1.1 km || 
|-id=068 bgcolor=#d6d6d6
| 334068 ||  || — || August 13, 2001 || San Marcello || A. Boattini, L. Tesi || — || align=right | 4.2 km || 
|-id=069 bgcolor=#d6d6d6
| 334069 ||  || — || August 10, 2001 || Palomar || NEAT || — || align=right | 4.8 km || 
|-id=070 bgcolor=#d6d6d6
| 334070 ||  || — || August 11, 2001 || Palomar || NEAT || EUP || align=right | 7.5 km || 
|-id=071 bgcolor=#fefefe
| 334071 ||  || — || August 14, 2001 || Palomar || NEAT || — || align=right | 2.7 km || 
|-id=072 bgcolor=#fefefe
| 334072 ||  || — || August 15, 2001 || Haleakala || NEAT || — || align=right data-sort-value="0.90" | 900 m || 
|-id=073 bgcolor=#FA8072
| 334073 ||  || — || August 14, 2001 || Haleakala || NEAT || — || align=right | 2.1 km || 
|-id=074 bgcolor=#fefefe
| 334074 ||  || — || August 16, 2001 || Socorro || LINEAR || — || align=right | 1.1 km || 
|-id=075 bgcolor=#fefefe
| 334075 ||  || — || August 17, 2001 || Palomar || NEAT || V || align=right data-sort-value="0.87" | 870 m || 
|-id=076 bgcolor=#d6d6d6
| 334076 ||  || — || August 17, 2001 || Ondřejov || P. Kušnirák, U. Babiaková || — || align=right | 4.7 km || 
|-id=077 bgcolor=#d6d6d6
| 334077 ||  || — || August 16, 2001 || Socorro || LINEAR || — || align=right | 4.0 km || 
|-id=078 bgcolor=#fefefe
| 334078 ||  || — || July 16, 2001 || Anderson Mesa || LONEOS || — || align=right | 1.0 km || 
|-id=079 bgcolor=#d6d6d6
| 334079 ||  || — || August 16, 2001 || Socorro || LINEAR || — || align=right | 3.2 km || 
|-id=080 bgcolor=#fefefe
| 334080 ||  || — || August 16, 2001 || Socorro || LINEAR || NYS || align=right data-sort-value="0.77" | 770 m || 
|-id=081 bgcolor=#fefefe
| 334081 ||  || — || August 17, 2001 || Socorro || LINEAR || — || align=right | 1.4 km || 
|-id=082 bgcolor=#E9E9E9
| 334082 ||  || — || August 16, 2001 || Palomar || NEAT || — || align=right | 4.9 km || 
|-id=083 bgcolor=#fefefe
| 334083 ||  || — || August 22, 2001 || Socorro || LINEAR || H || align=right data-sort-value="0.85" | 850 m || 
|-id=084 bgcolor=#d6d6d6
| 334084 ||  || — || August 20, 2001 || Ondřejov || P. Kušnirák, P. Pravec || — || align=right | 4.0 km || 
|-id=085 bgcolor=#d6d6d6
| 334085 ||  || — || August 25, 2001 || Socorro || LINEAR || — || align=right | 4.1 km || 
|-id=086 bgcolor=#d6d6d6
| 334086 ||  || — || August 19, 2001 || Socorro || LINEAR || — || align=right | 4.5 km || 
|-id=087 bgcolor=#d6d6d6
| 334087 ||  || — || August 19, 2001 || Socorro || LINEAR || — || align=right | 4.0 km || 
|-id=088 bgcolor=#d6d6d6
| 334088 ||  || — || August 19, 2001 || Socorro || LINEAR || — || align=right | 3.8 km || 
|-id=089 bgcolor=#d6d6d6
| 334089 ||  || — || August 20, 2001 || Socorro || LINEAR || TIR || align=right | 3.6 km || 
|-id=090 bgcolor=#d6d6d6
| 334090 ||  || — || August 20, 2001 || Socorro || LINEAR || — || align=right | 4.1 km || 
|-id=091 bgcolor=#d6d6d6
| 334091 ||  || — || August 21, 2001 || Kitt Peak || Spacewatch || — || align=right | 3.0 km || 
|-id=092 bgcolor=#fefefe
| 334092 ||  || — || August 21, 2001 || Kitt Peak || Spacewatch || NYS || align=right data-sort-value="0.77" | 770 m || 
|-id=093 bgcolor=#fefefe
| 334093 ||  || — || August 23, 2001 || Anderson Mesa || LONEOS || NYS || align=right data-sort-value="0.73" | 730 m || 
|-id=094 bgcolor=#fefefe
| 334094 ||  || — || August 25, 2001 || Socorro || LINEAR || — || align=right | 1.0 km || 
|-id=095 bgcolor=#E9E9E9
| 334095 ||  || — || August 22, 2001 || Socorro || LINEAR || — || align=right | 2.9 km || 
|-id=096 bgcolor=#fefefe
| 334096 ||  || — || August 22, 2001 || Socorro || LINEAR || H || align=right | 1.1 km || 
|-id=097 bgcolor=#fefefe
| 334097 ||  || — || August 23, 2001 || Anderson Mesa || LONEOS || H || align=right data-sort-value="0.74" | 740 m || 
|-id=098 bgcolor=#d6d6d6
| 334098 ||  || — || August 23, 2001 || Anderson Mesa || LONEOS || — || align=right | 4.1 km || 
|-id=099 bgcolor=#fefefe
| 334099 ||  || — || August 23, 2001 || Anderson Mesa || LONEOS || — || align=right | 1.1 km || 
|-id=100 bgcolor=#fefefe
| 334100 ||  || — || August 23, 2001 || Anderson Mesa || LONEOS || V || align=right data-sort-value="0.96" | 960 m || 
|}

334101–334200 

|-bgcolor=#d6d6d6
| 334101 ||  || — || August 23, 2001 || Anderson Mesa || LONEOS || — || align=right | 4.3 km || 
|-id=102 bgcolor=#d6d6d6
| 334102 ||  || — || August 23, 2001 || Anderson Mesa || LONEOS || — || align=right | 3.0 km || 
|-id=103 bgcolor=#fefefe
| 334103 ||  || — || August 23, 2001 || Anderson Mesa || LONEOS || NYS || align=right data-sort-value="0.86" | 860 m || 
|-id=104 bgcolor=#d6d6d6
| 334104 ||  || — || August 24, 2001 || Anderson Mesa || LONEOS || — || align=right | 4.6 km || 
|-id=105 bgcolor=#d6d6d6
| 334105 ||  || — || August 24, 2001 || Anderson Mesa || LONEOS || — || align=right | 3.4 km || 
|-id=106 bgcolor=#fefefe
| 334106 ||  || — || August 24, 2001 || Anderson Mesa || LONEOS || — || align=right | 1.1 km || 
|-id=107 bgcolor=#d6d6d6
| 334107 ||  || — || August 24, 2001 || Socorro || LINEAR || — || align=right | 4.1 km || 
|-id=108 bgcolor=#fefefe
| 334108 ||  || — || August 24, 2001 || Socorro || LINEAR || V || align=right data-sort-value="0.90" | 900 m || 
|-id=109 bgcolor=#d6d6d6
| 334109 ||  || — || August 24, 2001 || Socorro || LINEAR || — || align=right | 3.7 km || 
|-id=110 bgcolor=#fefefe
| 334110 ||  || — || August 25, 2001 || Socorro || LINEAR || — || align=right | 1.1 km || 
|-id=111 bgcolor=#d6d6d6
| 334111 ||  || — || August 25, 2001 || Socorro || LINEAR || LIX || align=right | 5.8 km || 
|-id=112 bgcolor=#d6d6d6
| 334112 ||  || — || August 20, 2001 || Haleakala || NEAT || — || align=right | 4.7 km || 
|-id=113 bgcolor=#fefefe
| 334113 ||  || — || August 19, 2001 || Socorro || LINEAR || — || align=right data-sort-value="0.87" | 870 m || 
|-id=114 bgcolor=#fefefe
| 334114 ||  || — || August 19, 2001 || Socorro || LINEAR || — || align=right | 1.1 km || 
|-id=115 bgcolor=#fefefe
| 334115 ||  || — || August 17, 2001 || Socorro || LINEAR || ERI || align=right | 2.2 km || 
|-id=116 bgcolor=#fefefe
| 334116 ||  || — || August 22, 2001 || Kiso || Y. Ohba || NYS || align=right data-sort-value="0.76" | 760 m || 
|-id=117 bgcolor=#fefefe
| 334117 ||  || — || August 24, 2001 || Socorro || LINEAR || PHO || align=right | 1.5 km || 
|-id=118 bgcolor=#E9E9E9
| 334118 ||  || — || August 28, 2001 || Palomar || NEAT || — || align=right | 1.00 km || 
|-id=119 bgcolor=#fefefe
| 334119 ||  || — || August 23, 2001 || Anderson Mesa || LONEOS || V || align=right data-sort-value="0.99" | 990 m || 
|-id=120 bgcolor=#fefefe
| 334120 ||  || — || August 29, 2001 || Palomar || NEAT || — || align=right | 1.2 km || 
|-id=121 bgcolor=#fefefe
| 334121 ||  || — || September 9, 2001 || Goodricke-Pigott || R. A. Tucker || — || align=right | 1.1 km || 
|-id=122 bgcolor=#fefefe
| 334122 ||  || — || September 8, 2001 || Anderson Mesa || LONEOS || — || align=right | 1.3 km || 
|-id=123 bgcolor=#fefefe
| 334123 ||  || — || September 7, 2001 || Socorro || LINEAR || NYS || align=right data-sort-value="0.82" | 820 m || 
|-id=124 bgcolor=#d6d6d6
| 334124 ||  || — || September 8, 2001 || Socorro || LINEAR || EUP || align=right | 8.4 km || 
|-id=125 bgcolor=#d6d6d6
| 334125 ||  || — || September 10, 2001 || Socorro || LINEAR || — || align=right | 4.3 km || 
|-id=126 bgcolor=#d6d6d6
| 334126 ||  || — || September 7, 2001 || Socorro || LINEAR || — || align=right | 3.8 km || 
|-id=127 bgcolor=#d6d6d6
| 334127 ||  || — || September 8, 2001 || Socorro || LINEAR || — || align=right | 7.3 km || 
|-id=128 bgcolor=#d6d6d6
| 334128 ||  || — || September 8, 2001 || Socorro || LINEAR || — || align=right | 3.7 km || 
|-id=129 bgcolor=#d6d6d6
| 334129 ||  || — || September 8, 2001 || Socorro || LINEAR || THB || align=right | 3.2 km || 
|-id=130 bgcolor=#E9E9E9
| 334130 ||  || — || September 10, 2001 || Socorro || LINEAR || EUN || align=right | 1.3 km || 
|-id=131 bgcolor=#fefefe
| 334131 ||  || — || September 10, 2001 || Socorro || LINEAR || H || align=right data-sort-value="0.68" | 680 m || 
|-id=132 bgcolor=#d6d6d6
| 334132 ||  || — || September 10, 2001 || Socorro || LINEAR || EUP || align=right | 6.3 km || 
|-id=133 bgcolor=#d6d6d6
| 334133 ||  || — || September 10, 2001 || Socorro || LINEAR || — || align=right | 3.9 km || 
|-id=134 bgcolor=#d6d6d6
| 334134 ||  || — || September 10, 2001 || Socorro || LINEAR || TIR || align=right | 3.4 km || 
|-id=135 bgcolor=#fefefe
| 334135 ||  || — || September 11, 2001 || Socorro || LINEAR || — || align=right data-sort-value="0.98" | 980 m || 
|-id=136 bgcolor=#d6d6d6
| 334136 ||  || — || September 11, 2001 || Socorro || LINEAR || — || align=right | 3.5 km || 
|-id=137 bgcolor=#d6d6d6
| 334137 ||  || — || September 11, 2001 || Socorro || LINEAR || — || align=right | 3.8 km || 
|-id=138 bgcolor=#fefefe
| 334138 ||  || — || September 10, 2001 || Socorro || LINEAR || — || align=right | 1.0 km || 
|-id=139 bgcolor=#FA8072
| 334139 ||  || — || September 12, 2001 || Socorro || LINEAR || — || align=right data-sort-value="0.82" | 820 m || 
|-id=140 bgcolor=#fefefe
| 334140 ||  || — || September 11, 2001 || Anderson Mesa || LONEOS || NYS || align=right data-sort-value="0.73" | 730 m || 
|-id=141 bgcolor=#fefefe
| 334141 ||  || — || September 11, 2001 || Anderson Mesa || LONEOS || NYS || align=right data-sort-value="0.79" | 790 m || 
|-id=142 bgcolor=#d6d6d6
| 334142 ||  || — || September 11, 2001 || Anderson Mesa || LONEOS || — || align=right | 3.3 km || 
|-id=143 bgcolor=#fefefe
| 334143 ||  || — || September 12, 2001 || Kitt Peak || Spacewatch || NYS || align=right data-sort-value="0.65" | 650 m || 
|-id=144 bgcolor=#fefefe
| 334144 ||  || — || September 12, 2001 || Socorro || LINEAR || MAS || align=right | 1.1 km || 
|-id=145 bgcolor=#d6d6d6
| 334145 ||  || — || September 12, 2001 || Socorro || LINEAR || — || align=right | 2.7 km || 
|-id=146 bgcolor=#fefefe
| 334146 ||  || — || September 12, 2001 || Socorro || LINEAR || NYS || align=right data-sort-value="0.83" | 830 m || 
|-id=147 bgcolor=#fefefe
| 334147 ||  || — || September 12, 2001 || Socorro || LINEAR || NYS || align=right data-sort-value="0.79" | 790 m || 
|-id=148 bgcolor=#d6d6d6
| 334148 ||  || — || September 12, 2001 || Socorro || LINEAR || HYG || align=right | 3.6 km || 
|-id=149 bgcolor=#fefefe
| 334149 ||  || — || September 12, 2001 || Socorro || LINEAR || NYS || align=right data-sort-value="0.97" | 970 m || 
|-id=150 bgcolor=#fefefe
| 334150 ||  || — || September 12, 2001 || Socorro || LINEAR || V || align=right data-sort-value="0.96" | 960 m || 
|-id=151 bgcolor=#d6d6d6
| 334151 ||  || — || September 12, 2001 || Socorro || LINEAR || — || align=right | 3.2 km || 
|-id=152 bgcolor=#d6d6d6
| 334152 ||  || — || September 12, 2001 || Socorro || LINEAR || — || align=right | 4.8 km || 
|-id=153 bgcolor=#fefefe
| 334153 ||  || — || September 9, 2001 || Anderson Mesa || LONEOS || — || align=right | 1.2 km || 
|-id=154 bgcolor=#d6d6d6
| 334154 ||  || — || September 11, 2001 || Anderson Mesa || LONEOS || EOS || align=right | 2.7 km || 
|-id=155 bgcolor=#d6d6d6
| 334155 ||  || — || September 11, 2001 || Socorro || LINEAR || EUP || align=right | 4.8 km || 
|-id=156 bgcolor=#d6d6d6
| 334156 ||  || — || September 18, 2001 || Kitt Peak || Spacewatch || — || align=right | 3.0 km || 
|-id=157 bgcolor=#fefefe
| 334157 ||  || — || September 18, 2001 || Kitt Peak || Spacewatch || — || align=right data-sort-value="0.80" | 800 m || 
|-id=158 bgcolor=#fefefe
| 334158 ||  || — || September 16, 2001 || Socorro || LINEAR || V || align=right data-sort-value="0.73" | 730 m || 
|-id=159 bgcolor=#fefefe
| 334159 ||  || — || September 16, 2001 || Socorro || LINEAR || MAS || align=right | 1.1 km || 
|-id=160 bgcolor=#fefefe
| 334160 ||  || — || September 16, 2001 || Socorro || LINEAR || — || align=right | 1.1 km || 
|-id=161 bgcolor=#fefefe
| 334161 ||  || — || September 16, 2001 || Socorro || LINEAR || MAS || align=right data-sort-value="0.99" | 990 m || 
|-id=162 bgcolor=#fefefe
| 334162 ||  || — || September 16, 2001 || Socorro || LINEAR || — || align=right | 1.1 km || 
|-id=163 bgcolor=#E9E9E9
| 334163 ||  || — || September 19, 2001 || Socorro || LINEAR || — || align=right data-sort-value="0.82" | 820 m || 
|-id=164 bgcolor=#d6d6d6
| 334164 ||  || — || September 20, 2001 || Socorro || LINEAR || — || align=right | 3.7 km || 
|-id=165 bgcolor=#fefefe
| 334165 ||  || — || September 20, 2001 || Socorro || LINEAR || — || align=right data-sort-value="0.78" | 780 m || 
|-id=166 bgcolor=#fefefe
| 334166 ||  || — || September 20, 2001 || Socorro || LINEAR || V || align=right data-sort-value="0.82" | 820 m || 
|-id=167 bgcolor=#fefefe
| 334167 ||  || — || September 16, 2001 || Socorro || LINEAR || ERI || align=right | 1.9 km || 
|-id=168 bgcolor=#d6d6d6
| 334168 ||  || — || September 16, 2001 || Socorro || LINEAR || URS || align=right | 6.3 km || 
|-id=169 bgcolor=#fefefe
| 334169 ||  || — || September 16, 2001 || Socorro || LINEAR || V || align=right | 1.1 km || 
|-id=170 bgcolor=#d6d6d6
| 334170 ||  || — || September 16, 2001 || Socorro || LINEAR || TIR || align=right | 3.9 km || 
|-id=171 bgcolor=#d6d6d6
| 334171 ||  || — || August 25, 2001 || Socorro || LINEAR || — || align=right | 3.8 km || 
|-id=172 bgcolor=#d6d6d6
| 334172 ||  || — || September 16, 2001 || Socorro || LINEAR || TIR || align=right | 3.3 km || 
|-id=173 bgcolor=#fefefe
| 334173 ||  || — || September 16, 2001 || Socorro || LINEAR || NYS || align=right data-sort-value="0.63" | 630 m || 
|-id=174 bgcolor=#fefefe
| 334174 ||  || — || September 16, 2001 || Socorro || LINEAR || — || align=right | 1.2 km || 
|-id=175 bgcolor=#fefefe
| 334175 ||  || — || September 16, 2001 || Socorro || LINEAR || NYS || align=right data-sort-value="0.83" | 830 m || 
|-id=176 bgcolor=#fefefe
| 334176 ||  || — || September 16, 2001 || Socorro || LINEAR || NYS || align=right data-sort-value="0.72" | 720 m || 
|-id=177 bgcolor=#d6d6d6
| 334177 ||  || — || September 16, 2001 || Socorro || LINEAR || LIX || align=right | 4.7 km || 
|-id=178 bgcolor=#d6d6d6
| 334178 ||  || — || September 16, 2001 || Socorro || LINEAR || — || align=right | 3.3 km || 
|-id=179 bgcolor=#d6d6d6
| 334179 ||  || — || September 16, 2001 || Socorro || LINEAR || HYG || align=right | 4.2 km || 
|-id=180 bgcolor=#d6d6d6
| 334180 ||  || — || September 17, 2001 || Socorro || LINEAR || TIR || align=right | 3.8 km || 
|-id=181 bgcolor=#fefefe
| 334181 ||  || — || September 17, 2001 || Socorro || LINEAR || V || align=right | 1.2 km || 
|-id=182 bgcolor=#fefefe
| 334182 ||  || — || September 17, 2001 || Socorro || LINEAR || ERI || align=right | 2.3 km || 
|-id=183 bgcolor=#fefefe
| 334183 ||  || — || September 17, 2001 || Socorro || LINEAR || — || align=right | 1.1 km || 
|-id=184 bgcolor=#FA8072
| 334184 ||  || — || September 17, 2001 || Socorro || LINEAR || H || align=right | 1.0 km || 
|-id=185 bgcolor=#fefefe
| 334185 ||  || — || September 19, 2001 || Socorro || LINEAR || — || align=right data-sort-value="0.97" | 970 m || 
|-id=186 bgcolor=#fefefe
| 334186 ||  || — || September 16, 2001 || Socorro || LINEAR || V || align=right data-sort-value="0.99" | 990 m || 
|-id=187 bgcolor=#fefefe
| 334187 ||  || — || September 17, 2001 || Socorro || LINEAR || — || align=right | 1.1 km || 
|-id=188 bgcolor=#d6d6d6
| 334188 ||  || — || September 19, 2001 || Socorro || LINEAR || VER || align=right | 2.9 km || 
|-id=189 bgcolor=#fefefe
| 334189 ||  || — || September 19, 2001 || Socorro || LINEAR || — || align=right data-sort-value="0.81" | 810 m || 
|-id=190 bgcolor=#d6d6d6
| 334190 ||  || — || September 19, 2001 || Socorro || LINEAR || — || align=right | 3.4 km || 
|-id=191 bgcolor=#fefefe
| 334191 ||  || — || September 19, 2001 || Socorro || LINEAR || — || align=right | 1.0 km || 
|-id=192 bgcolor=#d6d6d6
| 334192 ||  || — || September 19, 2001 || Socorro || LINEAR || — || align=right | 2.7 km || 
|-id=193 bgcolor=#d6d6d6
| 334193 ||  || — || September 19, 2001 || Socorro || LINEAR || — || align=right | 3.7 km || 
|-id=194 bgcolor=#E9E9E9
| 334194 ||  || — || September 18, 2001 || Anderson Mesa || LONEOS || MAR || align=right | 1.4 km || 
|-id=195 bgcolor=#E9E9E9
| 334195 ||  || — || September 19, 2001 || Socorro || LINEAR || — || align=right data-sort-value="0.91" | 910 m || 
|-id=196 bgcolor=#d6d6d6
| 334196 ||  || — || September 19, 2001 || Socorro || LINEAR || HYG || align=right | 3.5 km || 
|-id=197 bgcolor=#d6d6d6
| 334197 ||  || — || September 19, 2001 || Socorro || LINEAR || THM || align=right | 2.5 km || 
|-id=198 bgcolor=#fefefe
| 334198 ||  || — || September 19, 2001 || Socorro || LINEAR || — || align=right data-sort-value="0.91" | 910 m || 
|-id=199 bgcolor=#d6d6d6
| 334199 ||  || — || September 19, 2001 || Socorro || LINEAR || HYG || align=right | 3.3 km || 
|-id=200 bgcolor=#fefefe
| 334200 ||  || — || September 25, 2001 || Desert Eagle || W. K. Y. Yeung || NYS || align=right data-sort-value="0.79" | 790 m || 
|}

334201–334300 

|-bgcolor=#d6d6d6
| 334201 ||  || — || September 29, 2001 || Palomar || NEAT || — || align=right | 4.8 km || 
|-id=202 bgcolor=#fefefe
| 334202 ||  || — || September 17, 2001 || Anderson Mesa || LONEOS || — || align=right | 1.4 km || 
|-id=203 bgcolor=#d6d6d6
| 334203 ||  || — || September 20, 2001 || Socorro || LINEAR || HYG || align=right | 2.7 km || 
|-id=204 bgcolor=#E9E9E9
| 334204 ||  || — || September 20, 2001 || Socorro || LINEAR || — || align=right data-sort-value="0.82" | 820 m || 
|-id=205 bgcolor=#fefefe
| 334205 ||  || — || September 20, 2001 || Socorro || LINEAR || — || align=right | 1.00 km || 
|-id=206 bgcolor=#d6d6d6
| 334206 ||  || — || September 20, 2001 || Socorro || LINEAR || THM || align=right | 2.8 km || 
|-id=207 bgcolor=#E9E9E9
| 334207 ||  || — || September 20, 2001 || Socorro || LINEAR || — || align=right data-sort-value="0.82" | 820 m || 
|-id=208 bgcolor=#fefefe
| 334208 ||  || — || September 21, 2001 || Socorro || LINEAR || NYS || align=right data-sort-value="0.84" | 840 m || 
|-id=209 bgcolor=#d6d6d6
| 334209 ||  || — || September 22, 2001 || Socorro || LINEAR || — || align=right | 3.0 km || 
|-id=210 bgcolor=#fefefe
| 334210 ||  || — || September 23, 2001 || Socorro || LINEAR || NYS || align=right data-sort-value="0.58" | 580 m || 
|-id=211 bgcolor=#d6d6d6
| 334211 ||  || — || September 25, 2001 || Socorro || LINEAR || — || align=right | 3.9 km || 
|-id=212 bgcolor=#fefefe
| 334212 ||  || — || September 21, 2001 || Socorro || LINEAR || MAS || align=right data-sort-value="0.81" | 810 m || 
|-id=213 bgcolor=#fefefe
| 334213 ||  || — || September 26, 2001 || Socorro || LINEAR || NYS || align=right data-sort-value="0.70" | 700 m || 
|-id=214 bgcolor=#d6d6d6
| 334214 ||  || — || September 18, 2001 || Kitt Peak || Spacewatch || — || align=right | 3.9 km || 
|-id=215 bgcolor=#fefefe
| 334215 ||  || — || September 19, 2001 || Socorro || LINEAR || V || align=right data-sort-value="0.70" | 700 m || 
|-id=216 bgcolor=#d6d6d6
| 334216 ||  || — || September 21, 2001 || Palomar || NEAT || — || align=right | 4.5 km || 
|-id=217 bgcolor=#fefefe
| 334217 ||  || — || September 22, 2001 || Kitt Peak || Spacewatch || NYS || align=right data-sort-value="0.84" | 840 m || 
|-id=218 bgcolor=#d6d6d6
| 334218 ||  || — || September 18, 2001 || Apache Point || SDSS || — || align=right | 3.8 km || 
|-id=219 bgcolor=#fefefe
| 334219 ||  || — || September 18, 2001 || Anderson Mesa || LONEOS || — || align=right data-sort-value="0.87" | 870 m || 
|-id=220 bgcolor=#E9E9E9
| 334220 ||  || — || October 13, 2001 || Socorro || LINEAR || — || align=right | 1.2 km || 
|-id=221 bgcolor=#C2FFFF
| 334221 ||  || — || October 14, 2001 || Socorro || LINEAR || L5 || align=right | 13 km || 
|-id=222 bgcolor=#fefefe
| 334222 ||  || — || October 14, 2001 || Socorro || LINEAR || ERI || align=right | 3.0 km || 
|-id=223 bgcolor=#fefefe
| 334223 ||  || — || October 14, 2001 || Socorro || LINEAR || — || align=right | 1.1 km || 
|-id=224 bgcolor=#fefefe
| 334224 ||  || — || October 13, 2001 || Socorro || LINEAR || NYS || align=right data-sort-value="0.84" | 840 m || 
|-id=225 bgcolor=#fefefe
| 334225 ||  || — || October 13, 2001 || Socorro || LINEAR || NYS || align=right data-sort-value="0.92" | 920 m || 
|-id=226 bgcolor=#fefefe
| 334226 ||  || — || October 14, 2001 || Socorro || LINEAR || H || align=right data-sort-value="0.68" | 680 m || 
|-id=227 bgcolor=#d6d6d6
| 334227 ||  || — || October 13, 2001 || Socorro || LINEAR || — || align=right | 3.7 km || 
|-id=228 bgcolor=#fefefe
| 334228 ||  || — || October 13, 2001 || Socorro || LINEAR || — || align=right | 1.2 km || 
|-id=229 bgcolor=#d6d6d6
| 334229 ||  || — || October 13, 2001 || Socorro || LINEAR || — || align=right | 3.9 km || 
|-id=230 bgcolor=#fefefe
| 334230 ||  || — || October 13, 2001 || Socorro || LINEAR || — || align=right data-sort-value="0.87" | 870 m || 
|-id=231 bgcolor=#fefefe
| 334231 ||  || — || October 13, 2001 || Socorro || LINEAR || — || align=right data-sort-value="0.99" | 990 m || 
|-id=232 bgcolor=#fefefe
| 334232 ||  || — || October 13, 2001 || Socorro || LINEAR || NYS || align=right data-sort-value="0.88" | 880 m || 
|-id=233 bgcolor=#d6d6d6
| 334233 ||  || — || October 14, 2001 || Socorro || LINEAR || — || align=right | 3.8 km || 
|-id=234 bgcolor=#d6d6d6
| 334234 ||  || — || October 14, 2001 || Socorro || LINEAR || HYG || align=right | 3.0 km || 
|-id=235 bgcolor=#d6d6d6
| 334235 ||  || — || October 14, 2001 || Socorro || LINEAR || HYG || align=right | 3.7 km || 
|-id=236 bgcolor=#fefefe
| 334236 ||  || — || October 14, 2001 || Socorro || LINEAR || — || align=right | 1.1 km || 
|-id=237 bgcolor=#fefefe
| 334237 ||  || — || October 14, 2001 || Socorro || LINEAR || — || align=right | 1.0 km || 
|-id=238 bgcolor=#E9E9E9
| 334238 ||  || — || September 26, 2001 || Socorro || LINEAR || — || align=right | 1.7 km || 
|-id=239 bgcolor=#E9E9E9
| 334239 ||  || — || October 14, 2001 || Socorro || LINEAR || — || align=right | 1.4 km || 
|-id=240 bgcolor=#fefefe
| 334240 ||  || — || October 14, 2001 || Socorro || LINEAR || — || align=right data-sort-value="0.80" | 800 m || 
|-id=241 bgcolor=#d6d6d6
| 334241 ||  || — || October 14, 2001 || Socorro || LINEAR || HYG || align=right | 4.0 km || 
|-id=242 bgcolor=#d6d6d6
| 334242 ||  || — || October 15, 2001 || Socorro || LINEAR || THB || align=right | 3.3 km || 
|-id=243 bgcolor=#d6d6d6
| 334243 ||  || — || October 14, 2001 || Socorro || LINEAR || — || align=right | 5.3 km || 
|-id=244 bgcolor=#d6d6d6
| 334244 ||  || — || October 15, 2001 || Socorro || LINEAR || — || align=right | 6.3 km || 
|-id=245 bgcolor=#E9E9E9
| 334245 ||  || — || October 12, 2001 || Anderson Mesa || LONEOS || — || align=right | 1.9 km || 
|-id=246 bgcolor=#d6d6d6
| 334246 ||  || — || October 13, 2001 || Kitt Peak || Spacewatch || VER || align=right | 2.7 km || 
|-id=247 bgcolor=#d6d6d6
| 334247 ||  || — || October 10, 2001 || Palomar || NEAT || — || align=right | 3.3 km || 
|-id=248 bgcolor=#E9E9E9
| 334248 ||  || — || October 11, 2001 || Palomar || NEAT || — || align=right | 1.0 km || 
|-id=249 bgcolor=#d6d6d6
| 334249 ||  || — || October 14, 2001 || Socorro || LINEAR || EUP || align=right | 3.7 km || 
|-id=250 bgcolor=#fefefe
| 334250 ||  || — || October 14, 2001 || Socorro || LINEAR || NYS || align=right data-sort-value="0.74" | 740 m || 
|-id=251 bgcolor=#fefefe
| 334251 ||  || — || October 14, 2001 || Socorro || LINEAR || MAS || align=right data-sort-value="0.94" | 940 m || 
|-id=252 bgcolor=#fefefe
| 334252 ||  || — || October 12, 2001 || Haleakala || NEAT || — || align=right | 1.1 km || 
|-id=253 bgcolor=#fefefe
| 334253 ||  || — || October 13, 2001 || Socorro || LINEAR || — || align=right | 1.0 km || 
|-id=254 bgcolor=#fefefe
| 334254 ||  || — || October 14, 2001 || Anderson Mesa || LONEOS || — || align=right | 1.3 km || 
|-id=255 bgcolor=#fefefe
| 334255 ||  || — || October 14, 2001 || Anderson Mesa || LONEOS || V || align=right | 1.2 km || 
|-id=256 bgcolor=#FA8072
| 334256 ||  || — || October 15, 2001 || Palomar || NEAT || — || align=right | 1.2 km || 
|-id=257 bgcolor=#C2FFFF
| 334257 ||  || — || October 15, 2001 || Kitt Peak || Spacewatch || L5 || align=right | 9.9 km || 
|-id=258 bgcolor=#fefefe
| 334258 ||  || — || September 25, 2001 || Socorro || LINEAR || V || align=right data-sort-value="0.95" | 950 m || 
|-id=259 bgcolor=#d6d6d6
| 334259 ||  || — || October 14, 2001 || Apache Point || SDSS || HYG || align=right | 3.1 km || 
|-id=260 bgcolor=#C2FFFF
| 334260 ||  || — || October 14, 2001 || Apache Point || SDSS || L5 || align=right | 10 km || 
|-id=261 bgcolor=#E9E9E9
| 334261 ||  || — || October 14, 2001 || Apache Point || SDSS || — || align=right data-sort-value="0.79" | 790 m || 
|-id=262 bgcolor=#fefefe
| 334262 ||  || — || October 10, 2001 || Palomar || NEAT || — || align=right | 1.8 km || 
|-id=263 bgcolor=#d6d6d6
| 334263 || 2001 UD || — || October 16, 2001 || Farra d'Isonzo || Farra d'Isonzo || MEL || align=right | 4.4 km || 
|-id=264 bgcolor=#E9E9E9
| 334264 ||  || — || October 22, 2001 || Emerald Lane || L. Ball || — || align=right | 1.4 km || 
|-id=265 bgcolor=#fefefe
| 334265 ||  || — || October 17, 2001 || Socorro || LINEAR || NYS || align=right data-sort-value="0.69" | 690 m || 
|-id=266 bgcolor=#fefefe
| 334266 ||  || — || October 18, 2001 || Socorro || LINEAR || — || align=right | 1.3 km || 
|-id=267 bgcolor=#fefefe
| 334267 ||  || — || October 16, 2001 || Socorro || LINEAR || V || align=right data-sort-value="0.87" | 870 m || 
|-id=268 bgcolor=#fefefe
| 334268 ||  || — || October 17, 2001 || Socorro || LINEAR || FLO || align=right data-sort-value="0.76" | 760 m || 
|-id=269 bgcolor=#fefefe
| 334269 ||  || — || October 17, 2001 || Socorro || LINEAR || MAS || align=right data-sort-value="0.95" | 950 m || 
|-id=270 bgcolor=#fefefe
| 334270 ||  || — || October 17, 2001 || Socorro || LINEAR || MAS || align=right data-sort-value="0.88" | 880 m || 
|-id=271 bgcolor=#fefefe
| 334271 ||  || — || October 17, 2001 || Socorro || LINEAR || NYS || align=right | 1.0 km || 
|-id=272 bgcolor=#d6d6d6
| 334272 ||  || — || October 17, 2001 || Socorro || LINEAR || LIX || align=right | 3.9 km || 
|-id=273 bgcolor=#d6d6d6
| 334273 ||  || — || October 17, 2001 || Socorro || LINEAR || MEL || align=right | 4.5 km || 
|-id=274 bgcolor=#fefefe
| 334274 ||  || — || October 17, 2001 || Socorro || LINEAR || NYS || align=right data-sort-value="0.82" | 820 m || 
|-id=275 bgcolor=#fefefe
| 334275 ||  || — || October 17, 2001 || Socorro || LINEAR || MAS || align=right | 1.1 km || 
|-id=276 bgcolor=#d6d6d6
| 334276 ||  || — || October 21, 2001 || Kitt Peak || Spacewatch || HYG || align=right | 3.0 km || 
|-id=277 bgcolor=#fefefe
| 334277 ||  || — || October 21, 2001 || Kitt Peak || Spacewatch || V || align=right data-sort-value="0.66" | 660 m || 
|-id=278 bgcolor=#fefefe
| 334278 ||  || — || October 17, 2001 || Socorro || LINEAR || — || align=right | 1.2 km || 
|-id=279 bgcolor=#fefefe
| 334279 ||  || — || October 22, 2001 || Socorro || LINEAR || MAS || align=right | 1.0 km || 
|-id=280 bgcolor=#d6d6d6
| 334280 ||  || — || October 21, 2001 || Socorro || LINEAR || — || align=right | 2.7 km || 
|-id=281 bgcolor=#d6d6d6
| 334281 ||  || — || October 21, 2001 || Socorro || LINEAR || HYG || align=right | 3.0 km || 
|-id=282 bgcolor=#fefefe
| 334282 ||  || — || October 21, 2001 || Socorro || LINEAR || NYS || align=right data-sort-value="0.70" | 700 m || 
|-id=283 bgcolor=#fefefe
| 334283 ||  || — || October 23, 2001 || Socorro || LINEAR || NYS || align=right data-sort-value="0.68" | 680 m || 
|-id=284 bgcolor=#fefefe
| 334284 ||  || — || October 23, 2001 || Socorro || LINEAR || — || align=right | 1.4 km || 
|-id=285 bgcolor=#fefefe
| 334285 ||  || — || October 18, 2001 || Palomar || NEAT || — || align=right | 1.1 km || 
|-id=286 bgcolor=#fefefe
| 334286 ||  || — || October 21, 2001 || Socorro || LINEAR || — || align=right data-sort-value="0.92" | 920 m || 
|-id=287 bgcolor=#fefefe
| 334287 ||  || — || October 21, 2001 || Socorro || LINEAR || NYS || align=right data-sort-value="0.93" | 930 m || 
|-id=288 bgcolor=#fefefe
| 334288 ||  || — || October 24, 2001 || Palomar || NEAT || NYS || align=right data-sort-value="0.71" | 710 m || 
|-id=289 bgcolor=#E9E9E9
| 334289 ||  || — || September 20, 2001 || Socorro || LINEAR || ADE || align=right | 2.2 km || 
|-id=290 bgcolor=#fefefe
| 334290 ||  || — || October 16, 2001 || Palomar || NEAT || ERI || align=right | 1.7 km || 
|-id=291 bgcolor=#fefefe
| 334291 ||  || — || October 19, 2001 || Palomar || NEAT || NYS || align=right | 1.9 km || 
|-id=292 bgcolor=#E9E9E9
| 334292 ||  || — || October 19, 2001 || Palomar || NEAT || — || align=right | 1.9 km || 
|-id=293 bgcolor=#fefefe
| 334293 ||  || — || October 19, 2001 || Palomar || NEAT || NYS || align=right data-sort-value="0.83" | 830 m || 
|-id=294 bgcolor=#fefefe
| 334294 ||  || — || October 17, 2001 || Desert Eagle || W. K. Y. Yeung || MAS || align=right data-sort-value="0.92" | 920 m || 
|-id=295 bgcolor=#fefefe
| 334295 ||  || — || October 21, 2001 || Socorro || LINEAR || NYS || align=right data-sort-value="0.93" | 930 m || 
|-id=296 bgcolor=#fefefe
| 334296 ||  || — || October 23, 2001 || Socorro || LINEAR || NYS || align=right data-sort-value="0.86" | 860 m || 
|-id=297 bgcolor=#fefefe
| 334297 ||  || — || October 16, 2001 || Palomar || NEAT || — || align=right data-sort-value="0.95" | 950 m || 
|-id=298 bgcolor=#fefefe
| 334298 ||  || — || November 9, 2001 || Socorro || LINEAR || — || align=right | 1.0 km || 
|-id=299 bgcolor=#d6d6d6
| 334299 ||  || — || November 9, 2001 || Socorro || LINEAR || HYG || align=right | 3.0 km || 
|-id=300 bgcolor=#fefefe
| 334300 ||  || — || November 6, 2001 || Palomar || NEAT || PHO || align=right | 1.6 km || 
|}

334301–334400 

|-bgcolor=#E9E9E9
| 334301 ||  || — || November 10, 2001 || Socorro || LINEAR || — || align=right | 2.6 km || 
|-id=302 bgcolor=#E9E9E9
| 334302 ||  || — || November 10, 2001 || Socorro || LINEAR || — || align=right | 2.0 km || 
|-id=303 bgcolor=#fefefe
| 334303 ||  || — || November 10, 2001 || Socorro || LINEAR || — || align=right data-sort-value="0.96" | 960 m || 
|-id=304 bgcolor=#fefefe
| 334304 ||  || — || November 10, 2001 || Socorro || LINEAR || NYS || align=right data-sort-value="0.89" | 890 m || 
|-id=305 bgcolor=#d6d6d6
| 334305 ||  || — || November 12, 2001 || Socorro || LINEAR || — || align=right | 5.1 km || 
|-id=306 bgcolor=#fefefe
| 334306 ||  || — || November 15, 2001 || Socorro || LINEAR || — || align=right | 3.1 km || 
|-id=307 bgcolor=#E9E9E9
| 334307 ||  || — || November 12, 2001 || Socorro || LINEAR || — || align=right | 2.1 km || 
|-id=308 bgcolor=#fefefe
| 334308 ||  || — || November 12, 2001 || Socorro || LINEAR || V || align=right data-sort-value="0.84" | 840 m || 
|-id=309 bgcolor=#E9E9E9
| 334309 ||  || — || November 12, 2001 || Socorro || LINEAR || — || align=right | 1.5 km || 
|-id=310 bgcolor=#fefefe
| 334310 ||  || — || November 12, 2001 || Socorro || LINEAR || — || align=right | 1.0 km || 
|-id=311 bgcolor=#E9E9E9
| 334311 ||  || — || November 10, 2001 || Socorro || LINEAR || — || align=right | 1.4 km || 
|-id=312 bgcolor=#fefefe
| 334312 ||  || — || November 12, 2001 || Kitt Peak || Spacewatch || — || align=right data-sort-value="0.73" | 730 m || 
|-id=313 bgcolor=#C2FFFF
| 334313 ||  || — || November 11, 2001 || Apache Point || SDSS || L5 || align=right | 8.0 km || 
|-id=314 bgcolor=#fefefe
| 334314 ||  || — || November 11, 2001 || Socorro || LINEAR || CHL || align=right | 3.4 km || 
|-id=315 bgcolor=#C2FFFF
| 334315 ||  || — || November 12, 2001 || Apache Point || SDSS || L5 || align=right | 9.9 km || 
|-id=316 bgcolor=#fefefe
| 334316 ||  || — || November 17, 2001 || Socorro || LINEAR || — || align=right data-sort-value="0.99" | 990 m || 
|-id=317 bgcolor=#d6d6d6
| 334317 ||  || — || November 16, 2001 || Kitt Peak || Spacewatch || THB || align=right | 3.3 km || 
|-id=318 bgcolor=#fefefe
| 334318 ||  || — || November 17, 2001 || Socorro || LINEAR || NYS || align=right data-sort-value="0.76" | 760 m || 
|-id=319 bgcolor=#C2FFFF
| 334319 ||  || — || November 19, 2001 || Socorro || LINEAR || L5 || align=right | 13 km || 
|-id=320 bgcolor=#E9E9E9
| 334320 ||  || — || October 21, 2001 || Socorro || LINEAR || GEF || align=right | 1.3 km || 
|-id=321 bgcolor=#fefefe
| 334321 ||  || — || November 19, 2001 || Socorro || LINEAR || NYS || align=right data-sort-value="0.84" | 840 m || 
|-id=322 bgcolor=#fefefe
| 334322 ||  || — || November 20, 2001 || Kitt Peak || Spacewatch || MAS || align=right data-sort-value="0.69" | 690 m || 
|-id=323 bgcolor=#fefefe
| 334323 ||  || — || November 18, 2001 || Kitt Peak || Spacewatch || MAS || align=right data-sort-value="0.86" | 860 m || 
|-id=324 bgcolor=#fefefe
| 334324 ||  || — || November 20, 2001 || Socorro || LINEAR || MAS || align=right data-sort-value="0.78" | 780 m || 
|-id=325 bgcolor=#d6d6d6
| 334325 ||  || — || November 19, 2001 || Anderson Mesa || LONEOS || — || align=right | 4.8 km || 
|-id=326 bgcolor=#fefefe
| 334326 ||  || — || December 3, 2001 || Socorro || LINEAR || PHO || align=right | 1.2 km || 
|-id=327 bgcolor=#fefefe
| 334327 ||  || — || December 8, 2001 || Socorro || LINEAR || H || align=right data-sort-value="0.86" | 860 m || 
|-id=328 bgcolor=#fefefe
| 334328 ||  || — || December 10, 2001 || Socorro || LINEAR || CLA || align=right | 1.7 km || 
|-id=329 bgcolor=#fefefe
| 334329 ||  || — || December 11, 2001 || Socorro || LINEAR || — || align=right | 1.0 km || 
|-id=330 bgcolor=#fefefe
| 334330 ||  || — || December 11, 2001 || Socorro || LINEAR || — || align=right data-sort-value="0.96" | 960 m || 
|-id=331 bgcolor=#d6d6d6
| 334331 ||  || — || December 10, 2001 || Socorro || LINEAR || — || align=right | 2.6 km || 
|-id=332 bgcolor=#E9E9E9
| 334332 ||  || — || November 21, 2001 || Socorro || LINEAR || GEF || align=right | 1.3 km || 
|-id=333 bgcolor=#fefefe
| 334333 ||  || — || December 14, 2001 || Socorro || LINEAR || MAS || align=right data-sort-value="0.73" | 730 m || 
|-id=334 bgcolor=#fefefe
| 334334 ||  || — || December 14, 2001 || Socorro || LINEAR || — || align=right data-sort-value="0.99" | 990 m || 
|-id=335 bgcolor=#E9E9E9
| 334335 ||  || — || December 14, 2001 || Socorro || LINEAR || — || align=right data-sort-value="0.87" | 870 m || 
|-id=336 bgcolor=#E9E9E9
| 334336 ||  || — || December 14, 2001 || Socorro || LINEAR || — || align=right | 2.5 km || 
|-id=337 bgcolor=#E9E9E9
| 334337 ||  || — || December 14, 2001 || Socorro || LINEAR || — || align=right | 1.6 km || 
|-id=338 bgcolor=#fefefe
| 334338 ||  || — || December 14, 2001 || Socorro || LINEAR || — || align=right | 1.0 km || 
|-id=339 bgcolor=#d6d6d6
| 334339 ||  || — || December 14, 2001 || Socorro || LINEAR || — || align=right | 4.0 km || 
|-id=340 bgcolor=#E9E9E9
| 334340 ||  || — || December 14, 2001 || Socorro || LINEAR || — || align=right | 2.1 km || 
|-id=341 bgcolor=#fefefe
| 334341 ||  || — || December 15, 2001 || Socorro || LINEAR || — || align=right data-sort-value="0.82" | 820 m || 
|-id=342 bgcolor=#fefefe
| 334342 ||  || — || December 15, 2001 || Socorro || LINEAR || — || align=right | 1.2 km || 
|-id=343 bgcolor=#fefefe
| 334343 ||  || — || December 15, 2001 || Socorro || LINEAR || — || align=right | 1.1 km || 
|-id=344 bgcolor=#fefefe
| 334344 ||  || — || December 15, 2001 || Socorro || LINEAR || MAS || align=right | 1.1 km || 
|-id=345 bgcolor=#fefefe
| 334345 ||  || — || December 14, 2001 || Palomar || NEAT || — || align=right data-sort-value="0.84" | 840 m || 
|-id=346 bgcolor=#FA8072
| 334346 ||  || — || December 22, 2001 || Socorro || LINEAR || — || align=right | 1.4 km || 
|-id=347 bgcolor=#fefefe
| 334347 ||  || — || December 17, 2001 || Socorro || LINEAR || MAS || align=right data-sort-value="0.74" | 740 m || 
|-id=348 bgcolor=#fefefe
| 334348 ||  || — || December 17, 2001 || Socorro || LINEAR || — || align=right | 1.00 km || 
|-id=349 bgcolor=#fefefe
| 334349 ||  || — || December 18, 2001 || Socorro || LINEAR || V || align=right data-sort-value="0.87" | 870 m || 
|-id=350 bgcolor=#fefefe
| 334350 ||  || — || December 18, 2001 || Socorro || LINEAR || MAS || align=right data-sort-value="0.82" | 820 m || 
|-id=351 bgcolor=#E9E9E9
| 334351 ||  || — || December 18, 2001 || Socorro || LINEAR || — || align=right | 1.7 km || 
|-id=352 bgcolor=#FA8072
| 334352 ||  || — || December 18, 2001 || Socorro || LINEAR || — || align=right | 4.2 km || 
|-id=353 bgcolor=#E9E9E9
| 334353 ||  || — || December 18, 2001 || Socorro || LINEAR || — || align=right | 1.8 km || 
|-id=354 bgcolor=#E9E9E9
| 334354 ||  || — || December 18, 2001 || Socorro || LINEAR || — || align=right | 4.2 km || 
|-id=355 bgcolor=#fefefe
| 334355 ||  || — || December 19, 2001 || Kitt Peak || Spacewatch || — || align=right data-sort-value="0.85" | 850 m || 
|-id=356 bgcolor=#fefefe
| 334356 ||  || — || December 17, 2001 || Socorro || LINEAR || NYS || align=right data-sort-value="0.97" | 970 m || 
|-id=357 bgcolor=#fefefe
| 334357 ||  || — || December 17, 2001 || Socorro || LINEAR || — || align=right data-sort-value="0.98" | 980 m || 
|-id=358 bgcolor=#d6d6d6
| 334358 ||  || — || December 19, 2001 || Socorro || LINEAR || — || align=right | 3.4 km || 
|-id=359 bgcolor=#E9E9E9
| 334359 ||  || — || December 17, 2001 || Socorro || LINEAR || — || align=right | 2.7 km || 
|-id=360 bgcolor=#d6d6d6
| 334360 ||  || — || December 18, 2001 || Kitt Peak || Spacewatch || — || align=right | 3.2 km || 
|-id=361 bgcolor=#E9E9E9
| 334361 ||  || — || December 20, 2001 || Apache Point || SDSS || — || align=right | 1.7 km || 
|-id=362 bgcolor=#fefefe
| 334362 ||  || — || January 5, 2002 || Haleakala || NEAT || PHO || align=right | 1.5 km || 
|-id=363 bgcolor=#E9E9E9
| 334363 ||  || — || January 9, 2002 || Bergisch Gladbac || W. Bickel || — || align=right data-sort-value="0.91" | 910 m || 
|-id=364 bgcolor=#E9E9E9
| 334364 ||  || — || January 8, 2002 || Haleakala || NEAT || RAF || align=right | 1.3 km || 
|-id=365 bgcolor=#E9E9E9
| 334365 ||  || — || January 7, 2002 || Socorro || LINEAR || — || align=right | 2.8 km || 
|-id=366 bgcolor=#fefefe
| 334366 ||  || — || January 9, 2002 || Socorro || LINEAR || FLO || align=right data-sort-value="0.95" | 950 m || 
|-id=367 bgcolor=#E9E9E9
| 334367 ||  || — || December 14, 2001 || Kitt Peak || Spacewatch || DOR || align=right | 2.2 km || 
|-id=368 bgcolor=#E9E9E9
| 334368 ||  || — || January 9, 2002 || Socorro || LINEAR || — || align=right | 1.1 km || 
|-id=369 bgcolor=#fefefe
| 334369 ||  || — || January 9, 2002 || Socorro || LINEAR || — || align=right | 1.3 km || 
|-id=370 bgcolor=#E9E9E9
| 334370 ||  || — || January 9, 2002 || Socorro || LINEAR || KAZ || align=right | 1.7 km || 
|-id=371 bgcolor=#d6d6d6
| 334371 ||  || — || January 8, 2002 || Socorro || LINEAR || — || align=right | 3.0 km || 
|-id=372 bgcolor=#E9E9E9
| 334372 ||  || — || January 8, 2002 || Socorro || LINEAR || — || align=right | 1.4 km || 
|-id=373 bgcolor=#fefefe
| 334373 ||  || — || January 9, 2002 || Socorro || LINEAR || — || align=right | 1.4 km || 
|-id=374 bgcolor=#E9E9E9
| 334374 ||  || — || January 9, 2002 || Socorro || LINEAR || BRG || align=right | 2.0 km || 
|-id=375 bgcolor=#E9E9E9
| 334375 ||  || — || January 9, 2002 || Socorro || LINEAR || MAR || align=right | 1.8 km || 
|-id=376 bgcolor=#E9E9E9
| 334376 ||  || — || January 8, 2002 || Socorro || LINEAR || — || align=right | 1.5 km || 
|-id=377 bgcolor=#fefefe
| 334377 ||  || — || January 13, 2002 || Socorro || LINEAR || — || align=right | 1.1 km || 
|-id=378 bgcolor=#E9E9E9
| 334378 ||  || — || January 13, 2002 || Socorro || LINEAR || BRU || align=right | 3.6 km || 
|-id=379 bgcolor=#E9E9E9
| 334379 ||  || — || January 8, 2002 || Socorro || LINEAR || — || align=right | 1.6 km || 
|-id=380 bgcolor=#E9E9E9
| 334380 ||  || — || January 13, 2002 || Socorro || LINEAR || — || align=right | 1.2 km || 
|-id=381 bgcolor=#E9E9E9
| 334381 ||  || — || January 14, 2002 || Apache Point || SDSS || — || align=right | 1.2 km || 
|-id=382 bgcolor=#E9E9E9
| 334382 ||  || — || January 19, 2002 || Socorro || LINEAR || — || align=right | 1.3 km || 
|-id=383 bgcolor=#E9E9E9
| 334383 ||  || — || January 23, 2002 || Socorro || LINEAR || — || align=right | 1.4 km || 
|-id=384 bgcolor=#FA8072
| 334384 ||  || — || January 26, 2002 || Socorro || LINEAR || Tj (2.99) || align=right | 3.2 km || 
|-id=385 bgcolor=#E9E9E9
| 334385 ||  || — || January 17, 2002 || Palomar || NEAT || BRU || align=right | 3.3 km || 
|-id=386 bgcolor=#E9E9E9
| 334386 ||  || — || February 6, 2002 || Socorro || LINEAR || — || align=right | 1.4 km || 
|-id=387 bgcolor=#fefefe
| 334387 ||  || — || February 6, 2002 || Socorro || LINEAR || — || align=right | 1.3 km || 
|-id=388 bgcolor=#fefefe
| 334388 ||  || — || February 7, 2002 || Socorro || LINEAR || — || align=right data-sort-value="0.88" | 880 m || 
|-id=389 bgcolor=#E9E9E9
| 334389 ||  || — || February 7, 2002 || Socorro || LINEAR || — || align=right | 2.5 km || 
|-id=390 bgcolor=#E9E9E9
| 334390 ||  || — || February 7, 2002 || Socorro || LINEAR || — || align=right | 2.9 km || 
|-id=391 bgcolor=#E9E9E9
| 334391 ||  || — || February 7, 2002 || Socorro || LINEAR || RAF || align=right | 1.0 km || 
|-id=392 bgcolor=#E9E9E9
| 334392 ||  || — || February 14, 2002 || Desert Eagle || W. K. Y. Yeung || — || align=right | 1.8 km || 
|-id=393 bgcolor=#d6d6d6
| 334393 ||  || — || February 9, 2002 || Socorro || LINEAR || TIR || align=right | 4.1 km || 
|-id=394 bgcolor=#E9E9E9
| 334394 ||  || — || February 7, 2002 || Socorro || LINEAR || EUN || align=right | 1.8 km || 
|-id=395 bgcolor=#E9E9E9
| 334395 ||  || — || February 8, 2002 || Socorro || LINEAR || RAF || align=right | 1.7 km || 
|-id=396 bgcolor=#E9E9E9
| 334396 ||  || — || February 10, 2002 || Socorro || LINEAR || KON || align=right | 2.3 km || 
|-id=397 bgcolor=#E9E9E9
| 334397 ||  || — || February 10, 2002 || Socorro || LINEAR || MAR || align=right | 1.1 km || 
|-id=398 bgcolor=#E9E9E9
| 334398 ||  || — || February 10, 2002 || Socorro || LINEAR || — || align=right | 1.2 km || 
|-id=399 bgcolor=#E9E9E9
| 334399 ||  || — || February 10, 2002 || Socorro || LINEAR || — || align=right data-sort-value="0.99" | 990 m || 
|-id=400 bgcolor=#E9E9E9
| 334400 ||  || — || February 8, 2002 || Kitt Peak || M. W. Buie || — || align=right data-sort-value="0.89" | 890 m || 
|}

334401–334500 

|-bgcolor=#E9E9E9
| 334401 ||  || — || February 7, 2002 || Socorro || LINEAR || — || align=right | 2.2 km || 
|-id=402 bgcolor=#fefefe
| 334402 ||  || — || February 8, 2002 || Kitt Peak || Spacewatch || SUL || align=right | 2.1 km || 
|-id=403 bgcolor=#d6d6d6
| 334403 ||  || — || February 7, 2002 || Palomar || NEAT || — || align=right | 4.7 km || 
|-id=404 bgcolor=#fefefe
| 334404 ||  || — || February 8, 2002 || Kitt Peak || Spacewatch || — || align=right | 1.0 km || 
|-id=405 bgcolor=#E9E9E9
| 334405 ||  || — || February 9, 2002 || Kitt Peak || Spacewatch || — || align=right | 1.1 km || 
|-id=406 bgcolor=#E9E9E9
| 334406 ||  || — || February 15, 2002 || Socorro || LINEAR || — || align=right | 3.9 km || 
|-id=407 bgcolor=#E9E9E9
| 334407 ||  || — || February 11, 2002 || Socorro || LINEAR || — || align=right | 1.3 km || 
|-id=408 bgcolor=#E9E9E9
| 334408 ||  || — || February 16, 2002 || Palomar || NEAT || GEF || align=right | 1.6 km || 
|-id=409 bgcolor=#fefefe
| 334409 ||  || — || February 16, 2002 || Palomar || NEAT || — || align=right data-sort-value="0.82" | 820 m || 
|-id=410 bgcolor=#E9E9E9
| 334410 ||  || — || February 20, 2002 || Anderson Mesa || LONEOS || — || align=right | 1.8 km || 
|-id=411 bgcolor=#d6d6d6
| 334411 ||  || — || February 16, 2002 || Palomar || NEAT || EOS || align=right | 2.2 km || 
|-id=412 bgcolor=#FFC2E0
| 334412 ||  || — || March 9, 2002 || Palomar || NEAT || AMO || align=right data-sort-value="0.32" | 320 m || 
|-id=413 bgcolor=#E9E9E9
| 334413 ||  || — || February 9, 2002 || Kitt Peak || Spacewatch || — || align=right | 1.7 km || 
|-id=414 bgcolor=#E9E9E9
| 334414 ||  || — || March 12, 2002 || Kitt Peak || Spacewatch || — || align=right | 2.2 km || 
|-id=415 bgcolor=#E9E9E9
| 334415 ||  || — || February 15, 2002 || Socorro || LINEAR || JUN || align=right | 1.1 km || 
|-id=416 bgcolor=#E9E9E9
| 334416 ||  || — || March 13, 2002 || Socorro || LINEAR || — || align=right | 2.6 km || 
|-id=417 bgcolor=#fefefe
| 334417 ||  || — || March 13, 2002 || Socorro || LINEAR || MAS || align=right data-sort-value="0.82" | 820 m || 
|-id=418 bgcolor=#E9E9E9
| 334418 ||  || — || March 10, 2002 || Kitt Peak || Spacewatch || — || align=right | 2.1 km || 
|-id=419 bgcolor=#E9E9E9
| 334419 ||  || — || March 10, 2002 || Kitt Peak || Spacewatch || EUN || align=right | 1.4 km || 
|-id=420 bgcolor=#fefefe
| 334420 ||  || — || March 13, 2002 || Socorro || LINEAR || — || align=right data-sort-value="0.95" | 950 m || 
|-id=421 bgcolor=#E9E9E9
| 334421 ||  || — || March 12, 2002 || Palomar || NEAT || — || align=right | 1.8 km || 
|-id=422 bgcolor=#E9E9E9
| 334422 ||  || — || March 6, 2002 || Palomar || NEAT || — || align=right | 2.5 km || 
|-id=423 bgcolor=#E9E9E9
| 334423 ||  || — || March 15, 2002 || Palomar || NEAT || — || align=right | 2.3 km || 
|-id=424 bgcolor=#E9E9E9
| 334424 ||  || — || March 13, 2002 || Socorro || LINEAR || — || align=right | 2.3 km || 
|-id=425 bgcolor=#d6d6d6
| 334425 ||  || — || March 6, 2002 || Palomar || NEAT || — || align=right | 3.6 km || 
|-id=426 bgcolor=#E9E9E9
| 334426 ||  || — || April 1, 2002 || Palomar || NEAT || — || align=right | 1.7 km || 
|-id=427 bgcolor=#E9E9E9
| 334427 ||  || — || April 2, 2002 || Palomar || NEAT || — || align=right | 1.2 km || 
|-id=428 bgcolor=#d6d6d6
| 334428 ||  || — || April 4, 2002 || Kitt Peak || Spacewatch || — || align=right | 3.5 km || 
|-id=429 bgcolor=#d6d6d6
| 334429 ||  || — || April 4, 2002 || Kitt Peak || Spacewatch || HIL3:2 || align=right | 6.7 km || 
|-id=430 bgcolor=#E9E9E9
| 334430 ||  || — || April 8, 2002 || Palomar || NEAT || — || align=right | 2.6 km || 
|-id=431 bgcolor=#E9E9E9
| 334431 ||  || — || April 10, 2002 || Socorro || LINEAR || — || align=right | 1.2 km || 
|-id=432 bgcolor=#E9E9E9
| 334432 ||  || — || April 10, 2002 || Socorro || LINEAR || EUN || align=right | 1.4 km || 
|-id=433 bgcolor=#E9E9E9
| 334433 ||  || — || April 11, 2002 || Palomar || NEAT || — || align=right | 2.9 km || 
|-id=434 bgcolor=#E9E9E9
| 334434 ||  || — || April 11, 2002 || Socorro || LINEAR || EUN || align=right | 1.5 km || 
|-id=435 bgcolor=#E9E9E9
| 334435 ||  || — || April 12, 2002 || Haleakala || NEAT || — || align=right | 1.9 km || 
|-id=436 bgcolor=#d6d6d6
| 334436 ||  || — || April 13, 2002 || Palomar || NEAT || — || align=right | 4.1 km || 
|-id=437 bgcolor=#E9E9E9
| 334437 ||  || — || April 14, 2002 || Palomar || NEAT || RAF || align=right | 1.7 km || 
|-id=438 bgcolor=#E9E9E9
| 334438 ||  || — || April 14, 2002 || Palomar || NEAT || — || align=right | 1.9 km || 
|-id=439 bgcolor=#fefefe
| 334439 ||  || — || April 8, 2002 || Palomar || NEAT || — || align=right data-sort-value="0.57" | 570 m || 
|-id=440 bgcolor=#d6d6d6
| 334440 ||  || — || May 7, 2002 || Palomar || NEAT || — || align=right | 3.4 km || 
|-id=441 bgcolor=#d6d6d6
| 334441 ||  || — || May 5, 2002 || Anderson Mesa || LONEOS || — || align=right | 3.5 km || 
|-id=442 bgcolor=#fefefe
| 334442 ||  || — || May 5, 2002 || Palomar || NEAT || — || align=right | 2.6 km || 
|-id=443 bgcolor=#E9E9E9
| 334443 ||  || — || May 13, 2002 || Palomar || NEAT || JUN || align=right | 1.6 km || 
|-id=444 bgcolor=#E9E9E9
| 334444 ||  || — || October 17, 2003 || Apache Point || SDSS || — || align=right | 1.5 km || 
|-id=445 bgcolor=#d6d6d6
| 334445 ||  || — || May 24, 2002 || Palomar || NEAT || — || align=right | 4.1 km || 
|-id=446 bgcolor=#fefefe
| 334446 ||  || — || June 2, 2002 || Palomar || NEAT || — || align=right | 1.0 km || 
|-id=447 bgcolor=#E9E9E9
| 334447 ||  || — || June 10, 2002 || Palomar || NEAT || — || align=right | 2.6 km || 
|-id=448 bgcolor=#E9E9E9
| 334448 ||  || — || June 4, 2002 || Palomar || NEAT || — || align=right | 3.6 km || 
|-id=449 bgcolor=#fefefe
| 334449 ||  || — || July 4, 2002 || Palomar || NEAT || — || align=right data-sort-value="0.94" | 940 m || 
|-id=450 bgcolor=#E9E9E9
| 334450 ||  || — || July 5, 2002 || Socorro || LINEAR || — || align=right | 3.4 km || 
|-id=451 bgcolor=#E9E9E9
| 334451 ||  || — || July 14, 2002 || Palomar || NEAT || — || align=right | 2.2 km || 
|-id=452 bgcolor=#d6d6d6
| 334452 ||  || — || July 9, 2002 || Palomar || NEAT || K-2 || align=right | 1.6 km || 
|-id=453 bgcolor=#d6d6d6
| 334453 ||  || — || July 14, 2002 || Palomar || NEAT || — || align=right | 2.7 km || 
|-id=454 bgcolor=#d6d6d6
| 334454 ||  || — || July 5, 2002 || Palomar || NEAT || BRA || align=right | 2.0 km || 
|-id=455 bgcolor=#fefefe
| 334455 ||  || — || July 5, 2002 || Palomar || NEAT || — || align=right data-sort-value="0.73" | 730 m || 
|-id=456 bgcolor=#fefefe
| 334456 ||  || — || March 7, 2008 || Kitt Peak || Spacewatch || FLO || align=right data-sort-value="0.61" | 610 m || 
|-id=457 bgcolor=#FA8072
| 334457 ||  || — || July 29, 2002 || Palomar || NEAT || — || align=right | 1.0 km || 
|-id=458 bgcolor=#d6d6d6
| 334458 ||  || — || December 20, 2004 || Mount Lemmon || Mount Lemmon Survey || — || align=right | 2.7 km || 
|-id=459 bgcolor=#fefefe
| 334459 ||  || — || August 5, 2002 || Palomar || NEAT || — || align=right data-sort-value="0.98" | 980 m || 
|-id=460 bgcolor=#d6d6d6
| 334460 ||  || — || August 6, 2002 || Palomar || NEAT || — || align=right | 4.2 km || 
|-id=461 bgcolor=#fefefe
| 334461 ||  || — || August 6, 2002 || Palomar || NEAT || FLO || align=right data-sort-value="0.64" | 640 m || 
|-id=462 bgcolor=#fefefe
| 334462 ||  || — || August 6, 2002 || Palomar || NEAT || FLO || align=right data-sort-value="0.69" | 690 m || 
|-id=463 bgcolor=#fefefe
| 334463 ||  || — || August 9, 2002 || Socorro || LINEAR || FLO || align=right data-sort-value="0.79" | 790 m || 
|-id=464 bgcolor=#FA8072
| 334464 ||  || — || August 11, 2002 || Palomar || NEAT || — || align=right data-sort-value="0.97" | 970 m || 
|-id=465 bgcolor=#fefefe
| 334465 ||  || — || February 23, 1998 || Kitt Peak || Spacewatch || FLO || align=right data-sort-value="0.60" | 600 m || 
|-id=466 bgcolor=#d6d6d6
| 334466 ||  || — || August 15, 2002 || Palomar || NEAT || ALA || align=right | 3.9 km || 
|-id=467 bgcolor=#fefefe
| 334467 ||  || — || August 14, 2002 || Socorro || LINEAR || — || align=right | 1.0 km || 
|-id=468 bgcolor=#fefefe
| 334468 ||  || — || August 13, 2002 || Anderson Mesa || LONEOS || FLO || align=right data-sort-value="0.51" | 510 m || 
|-id=469 bgcolor=#FA8072
| 334469 ||  || — || August 8, 2002 || Palomar || NEAT || — || align=right data-sort-value="0.74" | 740 m || 
|-id=470 bgcolor=#E9E9E9
| 334470 ||  || — || August 8, 2002 || Palomar || S. F. Hönig || — || align=right | 3.8 km || 
|-id=471 bgcolor=#d6d6d6
| 334471 ||  || — || August 15, 2002 || Palomar || NEAT || NAE || align=right | 3.8 km || 
|-id=472 bgcolor=#d6d6d6
| 334472 ||  || — || August 4, 2002 || Palomar || NEAT || — || align=right | 4.8 km || 
|-id=473 bgcolor=#fefefe
| 334473 ||  || — || August 15, 2002 || Palomar || NEAT || — || align=right data-sort-value="0.73" | 730 m || 
|-id=474 bgcolor=#d6d6d6
| 334474 ||  || — || August 11, 2002 || Palomar || NEAT || — || align=right | 2.9 km || 
|-id=475 bgcolor=#fefefe
| 334475 ||  || — || August 8, 2002 || Palomar || NEAT || — || align=right data-sort-value="0.97" | 970 m || 
|-id=476 bgcolor=#E9E9E9
| 334476 ||  || — || August 8, 2002 || Palomar || NEAT || — || align=right | 2.9 km || 
|-id=477 bgcolor=#fefefe
| 334477 ||  || — || August 8, 2002 || Palomar || NEAT || — || align=right data-sort-value="0.65" | 650 m || 
|-id=478 bgcolor=#fefefe
| 334478 ||  || — || May 9, 2005 || Mount Lemmon || Mount Lemmon Survey || — || align=right data-sort-value="0.57" | 570 m || 
|-id=479 bgcolor=#d6d6d6
| 334479 ||  || — || September 20, 2008 || Kitt Peak || Spacewatch || — || align=right | 2.5 km || 
|-id=480 bgcolor=#E9E9E9
| 334480 ||  || — || March 13, 2010 || Catalina || CSS || — || align=right | 2.0 km || 
|-id=481 bgcolor=#fefefe
| 334481 ||  || — || August 18, 2002 || Haleakala || NEAT || H || align=right data-sort-value="0.93" | 930 m || 
|-id=482 bgcolor=#E9E9E9
| 334482 ||  || — || August 28, 2002 || Palomar || NEAT || — || align=right | 1.9 km || 
|-id=483 bgcolor=#d6d6d6
| 334483 ||  || — || August 26, 2002 || Palomar || NEAT || ARM || align=right | 4.7 km || 
|-id=484 bgcolor=#fefefe
| 334484 ||  || — || August 27, 2002 || Palomar || NEAT || — || align=right data-sort-value="0.75" | 750 m || 
|-id=485 bgcolor=#d6d6d6
| 334485 ||  || — || August 28, 2002 || Palomar || NEAT || — || align=right | 2.9 km || 
|-id=486 bgcolor=#d6d6d6
| 334486 ||  || — || August 29, 2002 || Palomar || NEAT || — || align=right | 3.3 km || 
|-id=487 bgcolor=#fefefe
| 334487 ||  || — || August 29, 2002 || Palomar || NEAT || — || align=right data-sort-value="0.62" | 620 m || 
|-id=488 bgcolor=#fefefe
| 334488 ||  || — || August 30, 2002 || Kitt Peak || Spacewatch || FLO || align=right data-sort-value="0.58" | 580 m || 
|-id=489 bgcolor=#E9E9E9
| 334489 ||  || — || August 29, 2002 || Palomar || S. F. Hönig || — || align=right | 1.9 km || 
|-id=490 bgcolor=#fefefe
| 334490 ||  || — || August 17, 2002 || Palomar || A. Lowe || — || align=right data-sort-value="0.81" | 810 m || 
|-id=491 bgcolor=#d6d6d6
| 334491 ||  || — || August 16, 2002 || Palomar || NEAT || LAU || align=right | 1.2 km || 
|-id=492 bgcolor=#fefefe
| 334492 ||  || — || August 29, 2002 || Palomar || NEAT || — || align=right | 1.0 km || 
|-id=493 bgcolor=#d6d6d6
| 334493 ||  || — || August 30, 2002 || Palomar || NEAT || EOS || align=right | 2.3 km || 
|-id=494 bgcolor=#d6d6d6
| 334494 ||  || — || August 19, 2002 || Palomar || NEAT || NAE || align=right | 2.1 km || 
|-id=495 bgcolor=#d6d6d6
| 334495 ||  || — || August 19, 2002 || Palomar || NEAT || ANF || align=right | 1.6 km || 
|-id=496 bgcolor=#fefefe
| 334496 ||  || — || August 28, 2002 || Palomar || NEAT || — || align=right data-sort-value="0.71" | 710 m || 
|-id=497 bgcolor=#d6d6d6
| 334497 ||  || — || August 27, 2002 || Palomar || NEAT || — || align=right | 2.2 km || 
|-id=498 bgcolor=#d6d6d6
| 334498 ||  || — || August 18, 2002 || Palomar || NEAT || — || align=right | 3.1 km || 
|-id=499 bgcolor=#d6d6d6
| 334499 ||  || — || August 18, 2002 || Palomar || NEAT || EOS || align=right | 2.0 km || 
|-id=500 bgcolor=#d6d6d6
| 334500 ||  || — || August 27, 2002 || Palomar || NEAT || — || align=right | 3.3 km || 
|}

334501–334600 

|-bgcolor=#d6d6d6
| 334501 ||  || — || August 27, 2002 || Palomar || NEAT || SAN || align=right | 1.8 km || 
|-id=502 bgcolor=#fefefe
| 334502 ||  || — || August 16, 2002 || Palomar || NEAT || — || align=right data-sort-value="0.86" | 860 m || 
|-id=503 bgcolor=#fefefe
| 334503 ||  || — || August 30, 2002 || Palomar || NEAT || FLO || align=right data-sort-value="0.51" | 510 m || 
|-id=504 bgcolor=#E9E9E9
| 334504 ||  || — || August 30, 2002 || Palomar || NEAT || NEM || align=right | 2.4 km || 
|-id=505 bgcolor=#fefefe
| 334505 ||  || — || August 26, 2002 || Palomar || NEAT || — || align=right data-sort-value="0.60" | 600 m || 
|-id=506 bgcolor=#d6d6d6
| 334506 ||  || — || March 15, 2010 || Mount Lemmon || Mount Lemmon Survey || TRE || align=right | 3.9 km || 
|-id=507 bgcolor=#fefefe
| 334507 ||  || — || November 25, 2006 || Kitt Peak || Spacewatch || — || align=right data-sort-value="0.90" | 900 m || 
|-id=508 bgcolor=#fefefe
| 334508 ||  || — || September 30, 2010 || Mount Lemmon || Mount Lemmon Survey || — || align=right data-sort-value="0.98" | 980 m || 
|-id=509 bgcolor=#fefefe
| 334509 ||  || — || September 4, 2002 || Anderson Mesa || LONEOS || FLO || align=right data-sort-value="0.88" | 880 m || 
|-id=510 bgcolor=#fefefe
| 334510 ||  || — || September 4, 2002 || Palomar || NEAT || FLO || align=right data-sort-value="0.74" | 740 m || 
|-id=511 bgcolor=#fefefe
| 334511 ||  || — || September 5, 2002 || Socorro || LINEAR || FLO || align=right data-sort-value="0.64" | 640 m || 
|-id=512 bgcolor=#fefefe
| 334512 ||  || — || September 5, 2002 || Socorro || LINEAR || FLO || align=right data-sort-value="0.73" | 730 m || 
|-id=513 bgcolor=#fefefe
| 334513 ||  || — || September 5, 2002 || Anderson Mesa || LONEOS || FLO || align=right data-sort-value="0.79" | 790 m || 
|-id=514 bgcolor=#d6d6d6
| 334514 ||  || — || September 5, 2002 || Anderson Mesa || LONEOS || — || align=right | 2.4 km || 
|-id=515 bgcolor=#fefefe
| 334515 ||  || — || September 4, 2002 || Anderson Mesa || LONEOS || — || align=right data-sort-value="0.90" | 900 m || 
|-id=516 bgcolor=#fefefe
| 334516 ||  || — || September 5, 2002 || Socorro || LINEAR || — || align=right | 1.1 km || 
|-id=517 bgcolor=#fefefe
| 334517 ||  || — || September 5, 2002 || Socorro || LINEAR || FLO || align=right data-sort-value="0.64" | 640 m || 
|-id=518 bgcolor=#fefefe
| 334518 ||  || — || September 5, 2002 || Socorro || LINEAR || — || align=right | 1.2 km || 
|-id=519 bgcolor=#fefefe
| 334519 ||  || — || September 5, 2002 || Socorro || LINEAR || V || align=right data-sort-value="0.90" | 900 m || 
|-id=520 bgcolor=#d6d6d6
| 334520 ||  || — || September 3, 2002 || Palomar || NEAT || — || align=right | 3.1 km || 
|-id=521 bgcolor=#fefefe
| 334521 ||  || — || September 11, 2002 || Haleakala || NEAT || FLO || align=right data-sort-value="0.82" | 820 m || 
|-id=522 bgcolor=#fefefe
| 334522 ||  || — || September 12, 2002 || Haleakala || NEAT || — || align=right data-sort-value="0.75" | 750 m || 
|-id=523 bgcolor=#d6d6d6
| 334523 ||  || — || September 12, 2002 || Palomar || NEAT || — || align=right | 3.1 km || 
|-id=524 bgcolor=#fefefe
| 334524 ||  || — || September 12, 2002 || Palomar || NEAT || — || align=right data-sort-value="0.71" | 710 m || 
|-id=525 bgcolor=#fefefe
| 334525 ||  || — || September 13, 2002 || Palomar || NEAT || — || align=right data-sort-value="0.72" | 720 m || 
|-id=526 bgcolor=#d6d6d6
| 334526 ||  || — || September 12, 2002 || Palomar || NEAT || — || align=right | 4.1 km || 
|-id=527 bgcolor=#FA8072
| 334527 ||  || — || September 13, 2002 || Goodricke-Pigott || R. A. Tucker || — || align=right data-sort-value="0.96" | 960 m || 
|-id=528 bgcolor=#d6d6d6
| 334528 ||  || — || September 13, 2002 || Palomar || NEAT || — || align=right | 4.6 km || 
|-id=529 bgcolor=#d6d6d6
| 334529 ||  || — || September 14, 2002 || Palomar || NEAT || TRE || align=right | 3.6 km || 
|-id=530 bgcolor=#fefefe
| 334530 ||  || — || September 15, 2002 || Palomar || NEAT || FLO || align=right data-sort-value="0.67" | 670 m || 
|-id=531 bgcolor=#fefefe
| 334531 ||  || — || September 15, 2002 || Haleakala || NEAT || — || align=right | 1.1 km || 
|-id=532 bgcolor=#fefefe
| 334532 ||  || — || September 6, 2002 || Socorro || LINEAR || FLO || align=right data-sort-value="0.64" | 640 m || 
|-id=533 bgcolor=#d6d6d6
| 334533 ||  || — || September 11, 2002 || Palomar || M. White, M. Collins || — || align=right | 2.3 km || 
|-id=534 bgcolor=#d6d6d6
| 334534 ||  || — || September 14, 2002 || Palomar || R. Matson || LAU || align=right | 1.3 km || 
|-id=535 bgcolor=#d6d6d6
| 334535 ||  || — || September 4, 2002 || Palomar || NEAT || NAE || align=right | 4.2 km || 
|-id=536 bgcolor=#d6d6d6
| 334536 ||  || — || September 13, 2002 || Palomar || NEAT || — || align=right | 3.1 km || 
|-id=537 bgcolor=#fefefe
| 334537 ||  || — || September 15, 2002 || Palomar || NEAT || FLO || align=right data-sort-value="0.62" | 620 m || 
|-id=538 bgcolor=#fefefe
| 334538 ||  || — || September 14, 2002 || Palomar || NEAT || — || align=right data-sort-value="0.57" | 570 m || 
|-id=539 bgcolor=#d6d6d6
| 334539 ||  || — || September 15, 2002 || Palomar || NEAT || EMA || align=right | 4.6 km || 
|-id=540 bgcolor=#d6d6d6
| 334540 ||  || — || September 15, 2002 || Palomar || NEAT || — || align=right | 3.0 km || 
|-id=541 bgcolor=#fefefe
| 334541 ||  || — || September 4, 2002 || Palomar || NEAT || FLO || align=right data-sort-value="0.49" | 490 m || 
|-id=542 bgcolor=#fefefe
| 334542 ||  || — || September 4, 2002 || Palomar || NEAT || — || align=right | 1.2 km || 
|-id=543 bgcolor=#d6d6d6
| 334543 ||  || — || September 15, 2002 || Palomar || NEAT || — || align=right | 3.3 km || 
|-id=544 bgcolor=#fefefe
| 334544 ||  || — || September 4, 2002 || Palomar || NEAT || — || align=right data-sort-value="0.87" | 870 m || 
|-id=545 bgcolor=#d6d6d6
| 334545 ||  || — || September 4, 2002 || Palomar || NEAT || — || align=right | 2.9 km || 
|-id=546 bgcolor=#fefefe
| 334546 ||  || — || September 27, 2002 || Palomar || NEAT || FLO || align=right data-sort-value="0.64" | 640 m || 
|-id=547 bgcolor=#fefefe
| 334547 ||  || — || September 26, 2002 || Palomar || NEAT || H || align=right data-sort-value="0.95" | 950 m || 
|-id=548 bgcolor=#fefefe
| 334548 ||  || — || September 28, 2002 || Palomar || NEAT || PHO || align=right | 1.2 km || 
|-id=549 bgcolor=#d6d6d6
| 334549 ||  || — || September 28, 2002 || Haleakala || NEAT || HIL3:2 || align=right | 6.2 km || 
|-id=550 bgcolor=#fefefe
| 334550 ||  || — || September 28, 2002 || Haleakala || NEAT || — || align=right | 1.1 km || 
|-id=551 bgcolor=#d6d6d6
| 334551 ||  || — || September 29, 2002 || Haleakala || NEAT || — || align=right | 4.3 km || 
|-id=552 bgcolor=#d6d6d6
| 334552 ||  || — || September 29, 2002 || Haleakala || NEAT || — || align=right | 3.1 km || 
|-id=553 bgcolor=#d6d6d6
| 334553 ||  || — || September 30, 2002 || Socorro || LINEAR || EOS || align=right | 2.5 km || 
|-id=554 bgcolor=#fefefe
| 334554 ||  || — || September 30, 2002 || Socorro || LINEAR || FLO || align=right data-sort-value="0.82" | 820 m || 
|-id=555 bgcolor=#d6d6d6
| 334555 ||  || — || September 16, 2002 || Palomar || NEAT || — || align=right | 2.3 km || 
|-id=556 bgcolor=#d6d6d6
| 334556 ||  || — || September 29, 2002 || Haleakala || NEAT || TEL || align=right | 1.6 km || 
|-id=557 bgcolor=#fefefe
| 334557 ||  || — || September 26, 2002 || Palomar || NEAT || — || align=right data-sort-value="0.71" | 710 m || 
|-id=558 bgcolor=#d6d6d6
| 334558 ||  || — || October 1, 2002 || Anderson Mesa || LONEOS || EOS || align=right | 2.7 km || 
|-id=559 bgcolor=#d6d6d6
| 334559 ||  || — || October 1, 2002 || Anderson Mesa || LONEOS || THB || align=right | 6.0 km || 
|-id=560 bgcolor=#fefefe
| 334560 ||  || — || October 2, 2002 || Socorro || LINEAR || — || align=right data-sort-value="0.96" | 960 m || 
|-id=561 bgcolor=#fefefe
| 334561 ||  || — || October 2, 2002 || Socorro || LINEAR || FLO || align=right data-sort-value="0.75" | 750 m || 
|-id=562 bgcolor=#d6d6d6
| 334562 ||  || — || October 2, 2002 || Socorro || LINEAR || TIR || align=right | 4.1 km || 
|-id=563 bgcolor=#fefefe
| 334563 ||  || — || October 4, 2002 || Socorro || LINEAR || PHO || align=right | 1.1 km || 
|-id=564 bgcolor=#fefefe
| 334564 ||  || — || October 3, 2002 || Campo Imperatore || CINEOS || — || align=right | 1.0 km || 
|-id=565 bgcolor=#fefefe
| 334565 ||  || — || October 3, 2002 || Campo Imperatore || CINEOS || — || align=right data-sort-value="0.94" | 940 m || 
|-id=566 bgcolor=#fefefe
| 334566 ||  || — || October 3, 2002 || Palomar || NEAT || — || align=right data-sort-value="0.96" | 960 m || 
|-id=567 bgcolor=#fefefe
| 334567 ||  || — || October 1, 2002 || Anderson Mesa || LONEOS || — || align=right data-sort-value="0.87" | 870 m || 
|-id=568 bgcolor=#d6d6d6
| 334568 ||  || — || October 3, 2002 || Palomar || NEAT || EOS || align=right | 2.7 km || 
|-id=569 bgcolor=#fefefe
| 334569 ||  || — || October 3, 2002 || Palomar || NEAT || — || align=right | 1.2 km || 
|-id=570 bgcolor=#fefefe
| 334570 ||  || — || October 3, 2002 || Palomar || NEAT || FLO || align=right data-sort-value="0.73" | 730 m || 
|-id=571 bgcolor=#d6d6d6
| 334571 ||  || — || October 4, 2002 || Socorro || LINEAR || — || align=right | 3.4 km || 
|-id=572 bgcolor=#fefefe
| 334572 ||  || — || October 4, 2002 || Socorro || LINEAR || — || align=right | 1.0 km || 
|-id=573 bgcolor=#d6d6d6
| 334573 ||  || — || October 4, 2002 || Socorro || LINEAR || — || align=right | 2.9 km || 
|-id=574 bgcolor=#d6d6d6
| 334574 ||  || — || October 1, 2002 || Anderson Mesa || LONEOS || — || align=right | 3.0 km || 
|-id=575 bgcolor=#d6d6d6
| 334575 ||  || — || October 4, 2002 || Anderson Mesa || LONEOS || — || align=right | 4.8 km || 
|-id=576 bgcolor=#d6d6d6
| 334576 ||  || — || October 4, 2002 || Palomar || NEAT || LIX || align=right | 4.0 km || 
|-id=577 bgcolor=#d6d6d6
| 334577 ||  || — || October 3, 2002 || Palomar || NEAT || EOS || align=right | 2.8 km || 
|-id=578 bgcolor=#d6d6d6
| 334578 ||  || — || October 3, 2002 || Palomar || NEAT || TIR || align=right | 4.1 km || 
|-id=579 bgcolor=#fefefe
| 334579 ||  || — || October 3, 2002 || Palomar || NEAT || — || align=right | 1.3 km || 
|-id=580 bgcolor=#d6d6d6
| 334580 ||  || — || October 3, 2002 || Campo Imperatore || CINEOS || — || align=right | 3.2 km || 
|-id=581 bgcolor=#d6d6d6
| 334581 ||  || — || October 4, 2002 || Palomar || NEAT || EOS || align=right | 2.6 km || 
|-id=582 bgcolor=#d6d6d6
| 334582 ||  || — || October 4, 2002 || Palomar || NEAT || — || align=right | 3.7 km || 
|-id=583 bgcolor=#fefefe
| 334583 ||  || — || October 4, 2002 || Palomar || NEAT || V || align=right data-sort-value="0.79" | 790 m || 
|-id=584 bgcolor=#d6d6d6
| 334584 ||  || — || October 4, 2002 || Anderson Mesa || LONEOS || — || align=right | 4.5 km || 
|-id=585 bgcolor=#d6d6d6
| 334585 ||  || — || October 5, 2002 || Palomar || NEAT || — || align=right | 3.3 km || 
|-id=586 bgcolor=#d6d6d6
| 334586 ||  || — || October 5, 2002 || Socorro || LINEAR || — || align=right | 3.3 km || 
|-id=587 bgcolor=#d6d6d6
| 334587 ||  || — || October 3, 2002 || Palomar || NEAT || — || align=right | 4.9 km || 
|-id=588 bgcolor=#d6d6d6
| 334588 ||  || — || October 4, 2002 || Palomar || NEAT || EOS || align=right | 2.7 km || 
|-id=589 bgcolor=#d6d6d6
| 334589 ||  || — || September 6, 2002 || Socorro || LINEAR || — || align=right | 3.9 km || 
|-id=590 bgcolor=#d6d6d6
| 334590 ||  || — || October 3, 2002 || Socorro || LINEAR || — || align=right | 3.5 km || 
|-id=591 bgcolor=#d6d6d6
| 334591 ||  || — || October 4, 2002 || Socorro || LINEAR || — || align=right | 3.8 km || 
|-id=592 bgcolor=#fefefe
| 334592 ||  || — || October 7, 2002 || Socorro || LINEAR || — || align=right data-sort-value="0.86" | 860 m || 
|-id=593 bgcolor=#d6d6d6
| 334593 ||  || — || October 5, 2002 || Socorro || LINEAR || — || align=right | 3.6 km || 
|-id=594 bgcolor=#d6d6d6
| 334594 ||  || — || October 6, 2002 || Socorro || LINEAR || — || align=right | 3.6 km || 
|-id=595 bgcolor=#d6d6d6
| 334595 ||  || — || October 6, 2002 || Socorro || LINEAR || — || align=right | 3.9 km || 
|-id=596 bgcolor=#d6d6d6
| 334596 ||  || — || October 10, 2002 || Palomar || NEAT || — || align=right | 3.1 km || 
|-id=597 bgcolor=#fefefe
| 334597 ||  || — || October 9, 2002 || Socorro || LINEAR || FLO || align=right data-sort-value="0.64" | 640 m || 
|-id=598 bgcolor=#d6d6d6
| 334598 ||  || — || October 9, 2002 || Socorro || LINEAR || — || align=right | 4.8 km || 
|-id=599 bgcolor=#fefefe
| 334599 ||  || — || October 9, 2002 || Socorro || LINEAR || — || align=right | 1.1 km || 
|-id=600 bgcolor=#fefefe
| 334600 ||  || — || October 9, 2002 || Socorro || LINEAR || NYS || align=right data-sort-value="0.67" | 670 m || 
|}

334601–334700 

|-bgcolor=#d6d6d6
| 334601 ||  || — || October 10, 2002 || Socorro || LINEAR || — || align=right | 3.6 km || 
|-id=602 bgcolor=#d6d6d6
| 334602 ||  || — || October 4, 2002 || Apache Point || SDSS || — || align=right | 2.9 km || 
|-id=603 bgcolor=#d6d6d6
| 334603 ||  || — || October 4, 2002 || Apache Point || SDSS || EUP || align=right | 4.9 km || 
|-id=604 bgcolor=#d6d6d6
| 334604 ||  || — || October 4, 2002 || Apache Point || SDSS || — || align=right | 5.1 km || 
|-id=605 bgcolor=#fefefe
| 334605 ||  || — || October 4, 2002 || Apache Point || SDSS || PHO || align=right | 1.2 km || 
|-id=606 bgcolor=#fefefe
| 334606 ||  || — || October 5, 2002 || Apache Point || SDSS || FLO || align=right data-sort-value="0.59" | 590 m || 
|-id=607 bgcolor=#d6d6d6
| 334607 ||  || — || October 5, 2002 || Apache Point || SDSS || — || align=right | 3.3 km || 
|-id=608 bgcolor=#d6d6d6
| 334608 ||  || — || October 10, 2002 || Apache Point || SDSS || — || align=right | 2.0 km || 
|-id=609 bgcolor=#d6d6d6
| 334609 ||  || — || October 10, 2002 || Apache Point || SDSS || — || align=right | 4.2 km || 
|-id=610 bgcolor=#fefefe
| 334610 ||  || — || October 3, 2002 || Socorro || LINEAR || — || align=right data-sort-value="0.98" | 980 m || 
|-id=611 bgcolor=#fefefe
| 334611 ||  || — || October 28, 2002 || Socorro || LINEAR || PHO || align=right | 1.5 km || 
|-id=612 bgcolor=#fefefe
| 334612 ||  || — || October 30, 2002 || Socorro || LINEAR || PHO || align=right | 1.5 km || 
|-id=613 bgcolor=#d6d6d6
| 334613 ||  || — || October 29, 2002 || Kitt Peak || Spacewatch || — || align=right | 3.0 km || 
|-id=614 bgcolor=#d6d6d6
| 334614 ||  || — || October 31, 2002 || Socorro || LINEAR || — || align=right | 3.0 km || 
|-id=615 bgcolor=#d6d6d6
| 334615 ||  || — || October 29, 2002 || Apache Point || SDSS || EOS || align=right | 1.8 km || 
|-id=616 bgcolor=#fefefe
| 334616 ||  || — || October 29, 2002 || Apache Point || SDSS || — || align=right data-sort-value="0.69" | 690 m || 
|-id=617 bgcolor=#fefefe
| 334617 ||  || — || October 30, 2002 || Apache Point || SDSS || FLO || align=right data-sort-value="0.60" | 600 m || 
|-id=618 bgcolor=#d6d6d6
| 334618 ||  || — || October 30, 2002 || Apache Point || SDSS || — || align=right | 4.1 km || 
|-id=619 bgcolor=#d6d6d6
| 334619 ||  || — || October 30, 2002 || Kvistaberg || UDAS || — || align=right | 3.1 km || 
|-id=620 bgcolor=#d6d6d6
| 334620 ||  || — || October 28, 2002 || Palomar || NEAT || — || align=right | 3.1 km || 
|-id=621 bgcolor=#d6d6d6
| 334621 ||  || — || November 1, 2002 || Palomar || NEAT || URS || align=right | 6.1 km || 
|-id=622 bgcolor=#fefefe
| 334622 ||  || — || November 1, 2002 || Palomar || NEAT || — || align=right data-sort-value="0.98" | 980 m || 
|-id=623 bgcolor=#d6d6d6
| 334623 ||  || — || November 1, 2002 || Palomar || NEAT || HYG || align=right | 3.8 km || 
|-id=624 bgcolor=#fefefe
| 334624 ||  || — || November 1, 2002 || Palomar || NEAT || FLO || align=right data-sort-value="0.81" | 810 m || 
|-id=625 bgcolor=#FA8072
| 334625 ||  || — || November 6, 2002 || Socorro || LINEAR || — || align=right | 2.4 km || 
|-id=626 bgcolor=#FA8072
| 334626 ||  || — || November 5, 2002 || Socorro || LINEAR || — || align=right data-sort-value="0.87" | 870 m || 
|-id=627 bgcolor=#fefefe
| 334627 ||  || — || November 6, 2002 || Socorro || LINEAR || FLO || align=right data-sort-value="0.75" | 750 m || 
|-id=628 bgcolor=#d6d6d6
| 334628 ||  || — || November 7, 2002 || Socorro || LINEAR || — || align=right | 2.7 km || 
|-id=629 bgcolor=#d6d6d6
| 334629 ||  || — || November 7, 2002 || Socorro || LINEAR || — || align=right | 3.0 km || 
|-id=630 bgcolor=#fefefe
| 334630 ||  || — || November 7, 2002 || Socorro || LINEAR || PHO || align=right | 2.0 km || 
|-id=631 bgcolor=#FA8072
| 334631 ||  || — || November 13, 2002 || Socorro || LINEAR || PHO || align=right | 1.7 km || 
|-id=632 bgcolor=#fefefe
| 334632 ||  || — || November 12, 2002 || Socorro || LINEAR || — || align=right data-sort-value="0.80" | 800 m || 
|-id=633 bgcolor=#d6d6d6
| 334633 ||  || — || November 12, 2002 || Socorro || LINEAR || — || align=right | 3.3 km || 
|-id=634 bgcolor=#d6d6d6
| 334634 ||  || — || November 13, 2002 || Socorro || LINEAR || — || align=right | 3.7 km || 
|-id=635 bgcolor=#d6d6d6
| 334635 ||  || — || November 13, 2002 || Socorro || LINEAR || Tj (2.93) || align=right | 3.8 km || 
|-id=636 bgcolor=#fefefe
| 334636 ||  || — || November 14, 2002 || Socorro || LINEAR || FLO || align=right data-sort-value="0.88" | 880 m || 
|-id=637 bgcolor=#FA8072
| 334637 ||  || — || November 12, 2002 || Socorro || LINEAR || — || align=right data-sort-value="0.85" | 850 m || 
|-id=638 bgcolor=#fefefe
| 334638 ||  || — || November 12, 2002 || Palomar || NEAT || — || align=right | 1.1 km || 
|-id=639 bgcolor=#d6d6d6
| 334639 ||  || — || November 5, 2002 || Nyukasa || Mount Nyukasa Stn. || — || align=right | 4.1 km || 
|-id=640 bgcolor=#d6d6d6
| 334640 ||  || — || November 13, 2002 || Palomar || NEAT || — || align=right | 4.2 km || 
|-id=641 bgcolor=#d6d6d6
| 334641 ||  || — || November 1, 2002 || Palomar || NEAT || — || align=right | 3.2 km || 
|-id=642 bgcolor=#d6d6d6
| 334642 ||  || — || November 5, 2002 || Palomar || NEAT || 637 || align=right | 2.5 km || 
|-id=643 bgcolor=#d6d6d6
| 334643 ||  || — || November 23, 2002 || Palomar || NEAT || — || align=right | 3.5 km || 
|-id=644 bgcolor=#d6d6d6
| 334644 ||  || — || November 24, 2002 || Palomar || NEAT || — || align=right | 3.8 km || 
|-id=645 bgcolor=#d6d6d6
| 334645 ||  || — || November 27, 2002 || Anderson Mesa || LONEOS || — || align=right | 3.4 km || 
|-id=646 bgcolor=#d6d6d6
| 334646 ||  || — || November 16, 2002 || Palomar || NEAT || — || align=right | 2.9 km || 
|-id=647 bgcolor=#fefefe
| 334647 ||  || — || November 23, 2002 || Palomar || NEAT || — || align=right data-sort-value="0.64" | 640 m || 
|-id=648 bgcolor=#d6d6d6
| 334648 ||  || — || December 3, 2002 || Palomar || NEAT || — || align=right | 3.8 km || 
|-id=649 bgcolor=#d6d6d6
| 334649 ||  || — || December 5, 2002 || Socorro || LINEAR || — || align=right | 3.7 km || 
|-id=650 bgcolor=#d6d6d6
| 334650 ||  || — || December 2, 2002 || Socorro || LINEAR || URS || align=right | 6.4 km || 
|-id=651 bgcolor=#d6d6d6
| 334651 ||  || — || December 5, 2002 || Anderson Mesa || LONEOS || — || align=right | 3.6 km || 
|-id=652 bgcolor=#fefefe
| 334652 ||  || — || December 6, 2002 || Socorro || LINEAR || H || align=right data-sort-value="0.94" | 940 m || 
|-id=653 bgcolor=#fefefe
| 334653 ||  || — || December 6, 2002 || Socorro || LINEAR || FLO || align=right data-sort-value="0.79" | 790 m || 
|-id=654 bgcolor=#fefefe
| 334654 ||  || — || December 7, 2002 || Socorro || LINEAR || V || align=right data-sort-value="0.82" | 820 m || 
|-id=655 bgcolor=#fefefe
| 334655 ||  || — || December 7, 2002 || Socorro || LINEAR || — || align=right | 1.2 km || 
|-id=656 bgcolor=#fefefe
| 334656 ||  || — || December 7, 2002 || Socorro || LINEAR || — || align=right | 1.6 km || 
|-id=657 bgcolor=#fefefe
| 334657 ||  || — || December 10, 2002 || Socorro || LINEAR || — || align=right | 1.1 km || 
|-id=658 bgcolor=#fefefe
| 334658 ||  || — || December 10, 2002 || Palomar || NEAT || — || align=right data-sort-value="0.82" | 820 m || 
|-id=659 bgcolor=#fefefe
| 334659 ||  || — || December 10, 2002 || Palomar || NEAT || — || align=right data-sort-value="0.86" | 860 m || 
|-id=660 bgcolor=#fefefe
| 334660 ||  || — || December 11, 2002 || Socorro || LINEAR || H || align=right data-sort-value="0.81" | 810 m || 
|-id=661 bgcolor=#fefefe
| 334661 ||  || — || December 13, 2002 || Socorro || LINEAR || PHO || align=right | 1.4 km || 
|-id=662 bgcolor=#fefefe
| 334662 ||  || — || December 11, 2002 || Socorro || LINEAR || — || align=right | 1.3 km || 
|-id=663 bgcolor=#fefefe
| 334663 ||  || — || November 7, 2002 || Kitt Peak || Spacewatch || — || align=right data-sort-value="0.78" | 780 m || 
|-id=664 bgcolor=#fefefe
| 334664 ||  || — || December 5, 2002 || Socorro || LINEAR || V || align=right data-sort-value="0.86" | 860 m || 
|-id=665 bgcolor=#fefefe
| 334665 ||  || — || December 5, 2002 || Socorro || LINEAR || — || align=right | 1.4 km || 
|-id=666 bgcolor=#d6d6d6
| 334666 ||  || — || December 5, 2002 || Socorro || LINEAR || — || align=right | 3.5 km || 
|-id=667 bgcolor=#d6d6d6
| 334667 ||  || — || December 6, 2002 || Socorro || LINEAR || — || align=right | 4.9 km || 
|-id=668 bgcolor=#d6d6d6
| 334668 ||  || — || December 31, 2002 || Socorro || LINEAR || — || align=right | 3.4 km || 
|-id=669 bgcolor=#fefefe
| 334669 ||  || — || December 31, 2002 || Socorro || LINEAR || ERI || align=right | 2.3 km || 
|-id=670 bgcolor=#fefefe
| 334670 ||  || — || December 31, 2002 || Socorro || LINEAR || — || align=right | 1.2 km || 
|-id=671 bgcolor=#d6d6d6
| 334671 ||  || — || December 27, 2002 || Palomar || NEAT || — || align=right | 4.9 km || 
|-id=672 bgcolor=#fefefe
| 334672 ||  || — || January 1, 2003 || Socorro || LINEAR || H || align=right data-sort-value="0.95" | 950 m || 
|-id=673 bgcolor=#FFC2E0
| 334673 ||  || — || January 7, 2003 || Socorro || LINEAR || APO +1km || align=right data-sort-value="0.57" | 570 m || 
|-id=674 bgcolor=#d6d6d6
| 334674 ||  || — || January 4, 2003 || Socorro || LINEAR || — || align=right | 3.7 km || 
|-id=675 bgcolor=#fefefe
| 334675 ||  || — || January 5, 2003 || Socorro || LINEAR || V || align=right | 1.1 km || 
|-id=676 bgcolor=#fefefe
| 334676 ||  || — || January 7, 2003 || Socorro || LINEAR || — || align=right | 2.4 km || 
|-id=677 bgcolor=#fefefe
| 334677 ||  || — || January 7, 2003 || Socorro || LINEAR || H || align=right data-sort-value="0.73" | 730 m || 
|-id=678 bgcolor=#d6d6d6
| 334678 ||  || — || January 10, 2003 || Socorro || LINEAR || — || align=right | 5.1 km || 
|-id=679 bgcolor=#fefefe
| 334679 ||  || — || January 11, 2003 || Kitt Peak || Spacewatch || — || align=right data-sort-value="0.75" | 750 m || 
|-id=680 bgcolor=#fefefe
| 334680 ||  || — || January 24, 2003 || La Silla || A. Boattini, H. Scholl || — || align=right data-sort-value="0.99" | 990 m || 
|-id=681 bgcolor=#d6d6d6
| 334681 ||  || — || January 24, 2003 || Palomar || NEAT || — || align=right | 4.2 km || 
|-id=682 bgcolor=#d6d6d6
| 334682 ||  || — || January 26, 2003 || Palomar || NEAT || THB || align=right | 4.1 km || 
|-id=683 bgcolor=#fefefe
| 334683 ||  || — || January 26, 2003 || Haleakala || NEAT || — || align=right data-sort-value="0.98" | 980 m || 
|-id=684 bgcolor=#fefefe
| 334684 ||  || — || January 26, 2003 || Haleakala || NEAT || H || align=right data-sort-value="0.78" | 780 m || 
|-id=685 bgcolor=#fefefe
| 334685 ||  || — || December 31, 2002 || Socorro || LINEAR || H || align=right data-sort-value="0.68" | 680 m || 
|-id=686 bgcolor=#fefefe
| 334686 ||  || — || January 28, 2003 || Socorro || LINEAR || H || align=right data-sort-value="0.82" | 820 m || 
|-id=687 bgcolor=#d6d6d6
| 334687 ||  || — || January 30, 2003 || Socorro || LINEAR || Tj (2.94) || align=right | 5.3 km || 
|-id=688 bgcolor=#fefefe
| 334688 ||  || — || December 31, 2002 || Socorro || LINEAR || H || align=right data-sort-value="0.69" | 690 m || 
|-id=689 bgcolor=#E9E9E9
| 334689 ||  || — || January 27, 2003 || Socorro || LINEAR || — || align=right | 1.2 km || 
|-id=690 bgcolor=#fefefe
| 334690 ||  || — || January 27, 2003 || Socorro || LINEAR || H || align=right data-sort-value="0.90" | 900 m || 
|-id=691 bgcolor=#fefefe
| 334691 ||  || — || January 27, 2003 || Socorro || LINEAR || — || align=right | 1.2 km || 
|-id=692 bgcolor=#fefefe
| 334692 ||  || — || January 31, 2003 || Socorro || LINEAR || H || align=right | 1.3 km || 
|-id=693 bgcolor=#fefefe
| 334693 ||  || — || January 26, 2003 || Kitt Peak || Spacewatch || MAS || align=right data-sort-value="0.97" | 970 m || 
|-id=694 bgcolor=#E9E9E9
| 334694 ||  || — || January 26, 2003 || Kitt Peak || Spacewatch || — || align=right data-sort-value="0.80" | 800 m || 
|-id=695 bgcolor=#d6d6d6
| 334695 ||  || — || February 6, 2003 || Bisei SG Center || BATTeRS || ALA || align=right | 6.2 km || 
|-id=696 bgcolor=#E9E9E9
| 334696 ||  || — || February 21, 2003 || Palomar || NEAT || — || align=right | 1.2 km || 
|-id=697 bgcolor=#fefefe
| 334697 ||  || — || February 23, 2003 || Jornada || D. S. Dixon || NYS || align=right data-sort-value="0.82" | 820 m || 
|-id=698 bgcolor=#fefefe
| 334698 ||  || — || March 7, 2003 || Saint-Véran || Saint-Véran Obs. || H || align=right data-sort-value="0.93" | 930 m || 
|-id=699 bgcolor=#d6d6d6
| 334699 ||  || — || March 6, 2003 || Anderson Mesa || LONEOS || — || align=right | 3.2 km || 
|-id=700 bgcolor=#d6d6d6
| 334700 ||  || — || March 7, 2003 || Socorro || LINEAR || — || align=right | 3.4 km || 
|}

334701–334800 

|-bgcolor=#E9E9E9
| 334701 ||  || — || March 8, 2003 || Anderson Mesa || LONEOS || — || align=right | 2.1 km || 
|-id=702 bgcolor=#fefefe
| 334702 ||  || — || March 8, 2003 || Socorro || LINEAR || — || align=right | 1.0 km || 
|-id=703 bgcolor=#FA8072
| 334703 ||  || — || March 8, 2003 || Anderson Mesa || LONEOS || Tj (2.92) || align=right | 3.4 km || 
|-id=704 bgcolor=#E9E9E9
| 334704 ||  || — || March 26, 2003 || Kleť || M. Tichý, M. Kočer || BAR || align=right | 1.4 km || 
|-id=705 bgcolor=#fefefe
| 334705 ||  || — || March 24, 2003 || Kitt Peak || Spacewatch || FLO || align=right data-sort-value="0.72" | 720 m || 
|-id=706 bgcolor=#E9E9E9
| 334706 ||  || — || March 30, 2003 || Socorro || LINEAR || — || align=right | 1.8 km || 
|-id=707 bgcolor=#fefefe
| 334707 ||  || — || March 24, 2003 || Kitt Peak || Spacewatch || fast? || align=right | 1.2 km || 
|-id=708 bgcolor=#E9E9E9
| 334708 ||  || — || March 26, 2003 || Palomar || NEAT || — || align=right | 1.3 km || 
|-id=709 bgcolor=#fefefe
| 334709 ||  || — || March 31, 2003 || Anderson Mesa || LONEOS || FLO || align=right data-sort-value="0.73" | 730 m || 
|-id=710 bgcolor=#E9E9E9
| 334710 ||  || — || March 26, 2003 || Kitt Peak || Spacewatch || — || align=right | 1.1 km || 
|-id=711 bgcolor=#fefefe
| 334711 ||  || — || March 24, 2003 || Kitt Peak || Spacewatch || — || align=right | 1.7 km || 
|-id=712 bgcolor=#E9E9E9
| 334712 ||  || — || April 2, 2003 || Haleakala || NEAT || — || align=right | 1.5 km || 
|-id=713 bgcolor=#E9E9E9
| 334713 ||  || — || April 5, 2003 || Haleakala || NEAT || — || align=right | 1.2 km || 
|-id=714 bgcolor=#fefefe
| 334714 ||  || — || April 6, 2003 || Socorro || LINEAR || — || align=right | 1.2 km || 
|-id=715 bgcolor=#E9E9E9
| 334715 ||  || — || April 9, 2003 || Palomar || NEAT || MAR || align=right | 1.0 km || 
|-id=716 bgcolor=#fefefe
| 334716 ||  || — || April 9, 2003 || Palomar || NEAT || — || align=right | 1.8 km || 
|-id=717 bgcolor=#fefefe
| 334717 ||  || — || April 10, 2003 || Kitt Peak || Spacewatch || — || align=right data-sort-value="0.84" | 840 m || 
|-id=718 bgcolor=#fefefe
| 334718 ||  || — || April 6, 2003 || Kitt Peak || Spacewatch || V || align=right data-sort-value="0.75" | 750 m || 
|-id=719 bgcolor=#d6d6d6
| 334719 ||  || — || April 11, 2003 || Kitt Peak || Spacewatch || — || align=right | 2.8 km || 
|-id=720 bgcolor=#d6d6d6
| 334720 ||  || — || May 2, 2003 || Kitt Peak || Spacewatch || — || align=right | 3.0 km || 
|-id=721 bgcolor=#E9E9E9
| 334721 ||  || — || May 3, 2003 || Kitt Peak || Spacewatch || DOR || align=right | 2.5 km || 
|-id=722 bgcolor=#E9E9E9
| 334722 ||  || — || May 5, 2003 || Socorro || LINEAR || — || align=right | 2.0 km || 
|-id=723 bgcolor=#E9E9E9
| 334723 ||  || — || May 23, 2003 || Reedy Creek || J. Broughton || — || align=right | 1.8 km || 
|-id=724 bgcolor=#E9E9E9
| 334724 ||  || — || May 25, 2003 || Kitt Peak || Spacewatch || — || align=right | 3.5 km || 
|-id=725 bgcolor=#E9E9E9
| 334725 ||  || — || May 22, 2003 || Anderson Mesa || LONEOS || JUN || align=right | 1.3 km || 
|-id=726 bgcolor=#E9E9E9
| 334726 ||  || — || May 25, 2003 || Kitt Peak || Spacewatch || — || align=right | 2.3 km || 
|-id=727 bgcolor=#E9E9E9
| 334727 ||  || — || May 26, 2003 || Haleakala || NEAT || — || align=right | 1.8 km || 
|-id=728 bgcolor=#fefefe
| 334728 ||  || — || May 27, 2003 || Kitt Peak || Spacewatch || — || align=right | 1.2 km || 
|-id=729 bgcolor=#E9E9E9
| 334729 ||  || — || June 26, 2003 || Anderson Mesa || LONEOS || JUN || align=right | 1.8 km || 
|-id=730 bgcolor=#E9E9E9
| 334730 ||  || — || July 3, 2003 || Kitt Peak || Spacewatch || — || align=right | 2.9 km || 
|-id=731 bgcolor=#E9E9E9
| 334731 ||  || — || July 24, 2003 || Campo Imperatore || CINEOS || — || align=right | 1.8 km || 
|-id=732 bgcolor=#E9E9E9
| 334732 ||  || — || July 22, 2003 || Palomar || NEAT || — || align=right | 3.0 km || 
|-id=733 bgcolor=#E9E9E9
| 334733 ||  || — || July 26, 2003 || Palomar || NEAT || — || align=right | 3.0 km || 
|-id=734 bgcolor=#E9E9E9
| 334734 ||  || — || July 23, 2003 || Palomar || NEAT || EUN || align=right | 1.9 km || 
|-id=735 bgcolor=#E9E9E9
| 334735 ||  || — || July 26, 2003 || Palomar || NEAT || EUN || align=right | 1.5 km || 
|-id=736 bgcolor=#FA8072
| 334736 ||  || — || July 31, 2003 || Haleakala || NEAT || — || align=right | 3.0 km || 
|-id=737 bgcolor=#E9E9E9
| 334737 ||  || — || July 29, 2003 || Haleakala || NEAT || JUN || align=right | 1.2 km || 
|-id=738 bgcolor=#E9E9E9
| 334738 ||  || — || July 24, 2003 || Palomar || NEAT || — || align=right | 2.2 km || 
|-id=739 bgcolor=#E9E9E9
| 334739 ||  || — || July 24, 2003 || Palomar || NEAT || — || align=right | 2.2 km || 
|-id=740 bgcolor=#E9E9E9
| 334740 ||  || — || August 1, 2003 || Socorro || LINEAR || — || align=right | 2.7 km || 
|-id=741 bgcolor=#E9E9E9
| 334741 ||  || — || August 1, 2003 || Socorro || LINEAR || — || align=right | 1.2 km || 
|-id=742 bgcolor=#E9E9E9
| 334742 ||  || — || August 22, 2003 || Palomar || NEAT || NEM || align=right | 3.0 km || 
|-id=743 bgcolor=#E9E9E9
| 334743 ||  || — || August 21, 2003 || Palomar || NEAT || — || align=right | 1.6 km || 
|-id=744 bgcolor=#E9E9E9
| 334744 ||  || — || August 22, 2003 || Palomar || NEAT || TIN || align=right | 1.7 km || 
|-id=745 bgcolor=#E9E9E9
| 334745 ||  || — || August 22, 2003 || Socorro || LINEAR || — || align=right | 3.1 km || 
|-id=746 bgcolor=#E9E9E9
| 334746 ||  || — || August 22, 2003 || Haleakala || NEAT || — || align=right | 3.4 km || 
|-id=747 bgcolor=#E9E9E9
| 334747 ||  || — || August 24, 2003 || Socorro || LINEAR || — || align=right | 3.1 km || 
|-id=748 bgcolor=#E9E9E9
| 334748 ||  || — || August 20, 2003 || Palomar || NEAT || GEF || align=right | 1.9 km || 
|-id=749 bgcolor=#E9E9E9
| 334749 ||  || — || August 22, 2003 || Palomar || NEAT || DOR || align=right | 2.7 km || 
|-id=750 bgcolor=#E9E9E9
| 334750 ||  || — || August 24, 2003 || Socorro || LINEAR || — || align=right | 3.2 km || 
|-id=751 bgcolor=#d6d6d6
| 334751 ||  || — || August 25, 2003 || Socorro || LINEAR || — || align=right | 3.6 km || 
|-id=752 bgcolor=#E9E9E9
| 334752 ||  || — || August 29, 2003 || Haleakala || NEAT || — || align=right | 3.5 km || 
|-id=753 bgcolor=#E9E9E9
| 334753 ||  || — || September 1, 2003 || Socorro || LINEAR || — || align=right | 4.0 km || 
|-id=754 bgcolor=#E9E9E9
| 334754 ||  || — || September 3, 2003 || Reedy Creek || J. Broughton || — || align=right | 2.4 km || 
|-id=755 bgcolor=#E9E9E9
| 334755 ||  || — || September 5, 2003 || Campo Imperatore || CINEOS || GEF || align=right | 1.8 km || 
|-id=756 bgcolor=#E9E9E9
| 334756 Leövey ||  ||  || September 4, 2003 || Piszkéstető || K. Sárneczky, B. Sipőcz || — || align=right | 2.3 km || 
|-id=757 bgcolor=#E9E9E9
| 334757 ||  || — || September 2, 2003 || Socorro || LINEAR || JUN || align=right | 2.0 km || 
|-id=758 bgcolor=#E9E9E9
| 334758 ||  || — || September 15, 2003 || Palomar || NEAT || — || align=right | 2.8 km || 
|-id=759 bgcolor=#fefefe
| 334759 ||  || — || September 2, 2003 || Socorro || LINEAR || — || align=right data-sort-value="0.98" | 980 m || 
|-id=760 bgcolor=#E9E9E9
| 334760 ||  || — || September 16, 2003 || Kitt Peak || Spacewatch || — || align=right | 1.0 km || 
|-id=761 bgcolor=#E9E9E9
| 334761 ||  || — || September 17, 2003 || Kitt Peak || Spacewatch || WIT || align=right | 1.1 km || 
|-id=762 bgcolor=#E9E9E9
| 334762 ||  || — || September 18, 2003 || Palomar || NEAT || — || align=right | 3.1 km || 
|-id=763 bgcolor=#E9E9E9
| 334763 ||  || — || September 18, 2003 || Palomar || NEAT || — || align=right | 3.3 km || 
|-id=764 bgcolor=#E9E9E9
| 334764 ||  || — || September 17, 2003 || Anderson Mesa || LONEOS || — || align=right | 3.4 km || 
|-id=765 bgcolor=#E9E9E9
| 334765 ||  || — || September 17, 2003 || Campo Imperatore || CINEOS || — || align=right | 2.1 km || 
|-id=766 bgcolor=#E9E9E9
| 334766 ||  || — || September 17, 2003 || Campo Imperatore || CINEOS || WIT || align=right | 1.4 km || 
|-id=767 bgcolor=#E9E9E9
| 334767 ||  || — || September 18, 2003 || Kitt Peak || Spacewatch || — || align=right | 2.9 km || 
|-id=768 bgcolor=#E9E9E9
| 334768 ||  || — || September 18, 2003 || Siding Spring || R. H. McNaught || — || align=right | 3.5 km || 
|-id=769 bgcolor=#E9E9E9
| 334769 ||  || — || September 19, 2003 || Kitt Peak || Spacewatch || GEF || align=right | 1.4 km || 
|-id=770 bgcolor=#E9E9E9
| 334770 ||  || — || September 19, 2003 || Haleakala || NEAT || — || align=right | 3.6 km || 
|-id=771 bgcolor=#fefefe
| 334771 ||  || — || September 18, 2003 || Socorro || LINEAR || — || align=right | 1.3 km || 
|-id=772 bgcolor=#E9E9E9
| 334772 ||  || — || September 18, 2003 || Palomar || NEAT || TIN || align=right | 1.7 km || 
|-id=773 bgcolor=#E9E9E9
| 334773 ||  || — || September 19, 2003 || Palomar || NEAT || — || align=right | 4.0 km || 
|-id=774 bgcolor=#E9E9E9
| 334774 ||  || — || September 20, 2003 || Socorro || LINEAR || — || align=right | 2.3 km || 
|-id=775 bgcolor=#E9E9E9
| 334775 ||  || — || September 16, 2003 || Anderson Mesa || LONEOS || GEF || align=right | 1.4 km || 
|-id=776 bgcolor=#d6d6d6
| 334776 ||  || — || September 20, 2003 || Socorro || LINEAR || 615 || align=right | 1.9 km || 
|-id=777 bgcolor=#E9E9E9
| 334777 ||  || — || September 18, 2003 || Palomar || NEAT || — || align=right | 2.8 km || 
|-id=778 bgcolor=#E9E9E9
| 334778 ||  || — || September 18, 2003 || Palomar || NEAT || WAT || align=right | 2.2 km || 
|-id=779 bgcolor=#d6d6d6
| 334779 ||  || — || September 22, 2003 || Palomar || NEAT || — || align=right | 4.2 km || 
|-id=780 bgcolor=#E9E9E9
| 334780 ||  || — || September 20, 2003 || Palomar || NEAT || — || align=right | 4.1 km || 
|-id=781 bgcolor=#E9E9E9
| 334781 ||  || — || September 18, 2003 || Kitt Peak || Spacewatch || — || align=right | 3.4 km || 
|-id=782 bgcolor=#E9E9E9
| 334782 ||  || — || September 20, 2003 || Palomar || NEAT || — || align=right | 3.5 km || 
|-id=783 bgcolor=#E9E9E9
| 334783 ||  || — || September 17, 2003 || Socorro || LINEAR || — || align=right | 3.7 km || 
|-id=784 bgcolor=#E9E9E9
| 334784 ||  || — || September 19, 2003 || Anderson Mesa || LONEOS || — || align=right | 3.9 km || 
|-id=785 bgcolor=#E9E9E9
| 334785 ||  || — || September 19, 2003 || Anderson Mesa || LONEOS || — || align=right | 2.9 km || 
|-id=786 bgcolor=#d6d6d6
| 334786 ||  || — || September 17, 2003 || Palomar || NEAT || — || align=right | 2.8 km || 
|-id=787 bgcolor=#fefefe
| 334787 ||  || — || September 20, 2003 || Anderson Mesa || LONEOS || — || align=right data-sort-value="0.75" | 750 m || 
|-id=788 bgcolor=#E9E9E9
| 334788 ||  || — || September 23, 2003 || Haleakala || NEAT || INO || align=right | 1.3 km || 
|-id=789 bgcolor=#fefefe
| 334789 ||  || — || September 23, 2003 || Haleakala || NEAT || NYS || align=right data-sort-value="0.84" | 840 m || 
|-id=790 bgcolor=#E9E9E9
| 334790 ||  || — || September 18, 2003 || Socorro || LINEAR || — || align=right | 3.3 km || 
|-id=791 bgcolor=#E9E9E9
| 334791 ||  || — || September 18, 2003 || Palomar || NEAT || — || align=right | 3.2 km || 
|-id=792 bgcolor=#E9E9E9
| 334792 ||  || — || September 18, 2003 || Kitt Peak || Spacewatch || PAD || align=right | 1.8 km || 
|-id=793 bgcolor=#fefefe
| 334793 ||  || — || September 18, 2003 || Kitt Peak || Spacewatch || — || align=right | 1.0 km || 
|-id=794 bgcolor=#E9E9E9
| 334794 ||  || — || September 18, 2003 || Palomar || NEAT || — || align=right | 2.8 km || 
|-id=795 bgcolor=#E9E9E9
| 334795 ||  || — || September 22, 2003 || Anderson Mesa || LONEOS || — || align=right | 1.8 km || 
|-id=796 bgcolor=#E9E9E9
| 334796 ||  || — || September 22, 2003 || Socorro || LINEAR || — || align=right | 3.1 km || 
|-id=797 bgcolor=#E9E9E9
| 334797 ||  || — || September 19, 2003 || Palomar || NEAT || GEF || align=right | 1.5 km || 
|-id=798 bgcolor=#E9E9E9
| 334798 ||  || — || September 20, 2003 || Kitt Peak || Spacewatch || — || align=right | 2.5 km || 
|-id=799 bgcolor=#E9E9E9
| 334799 ||  || — || September 21, 2003 || Anderson Mesa || LONEOS || — || align=right | 3.5 km || 
|-id=800 bgcolor=#d6d6d6
| 334800 ||  || — || September 23, 2003 || Haleakala || NEAT || — || align=right | 4.6 km || 
|}

334801–334900 

|-bgcolor=#E9E9E9
| 334801 ||  || — || September 26, 2003 || Socorro || LINEAR || AGN || align=right | 1.5 km || 
|-id=802 bgcolor=#d6d6d6
| 334802 ||  || — || September 25, 2003 || Bergisch Gladbac || W. Bickel || — || align=right | 3.4 km || 
|-id=803 bgcolor=#E9E9E9
| 334803 ||  || — || September 26, 2003 || Socorro || LINEAR || CLO || align=right | 3.5 km || 
|-id=804 bgcolor=#E9E9E9
| 334804 ||  || — || September 27, 2003 || Kitt Peak || Spacewatch || WIT || align=right | 1.2 km || 
|-id=805 bgcolor=#E9E9E9
| 334805 ||  || — || September 20, 2003 || Socorro || LINEAR || — || align=right | 4.2 km || 
|-id=806 bgcolor=#E9E9E9
| 334806 ||  || — || September 20, 2003 || Kitt Peak || Spacewatch || MRX || align=right | 1.4 km || 
|-id=807 bgcolor=#E9E9E9
| 334807 ||  || — || September 27, 2003 || Socorro || LINEAR || WIT || align=right | 1.5 km || 
|-id=808 bgcolor=#E9E9E9
| 334808 ||  || — || September 18, 2003 || Haleakala || NEAT || — || align=right | 2.4 km || 
|-id=809 bgcolor=#E9E9E9
| 334809 ||  || — || September 18, 2003 || Haleakala || NEAT || — || align=right | 3.7 km || 
|-id=810 bgcolor=#d6d6d6
| 334810 ||  || — || September 18, 2003 || Haleakala || NEAT || — || align=right | 2.7 km || 
|-id=811 bgcolor=#d6d6d6
| 334811 ||  || — || September 18, 2003 || Haleakala || NEAT || — || align=right | 4.0 km || 
|-id=812 bgcolor=#E9E9E9
| 334812 ||  || — || September 17, 2003 || Palomar || NEAT || — || align=right | 3.0 km || 
|-id=813 bgcolor=#E9E9E9
| 334813 ||  || — || September 27, 2003 || Socorro || LINEAR || — || align=right | 2.5 km || 
|-id=814 bgcolor=#E9E9E9
| 334814 ||  || — || September 28, 2003 || Haleakala || NEAT || EUN || align=right | 1.7 km || 
|-id=815 bgcolor=#fefefe
| 334815 ||  || — || September 30, 2003 || Socorro || LINEAR || V || align=right data-sort-value="0.82" | 820 m || 
|-id=816 bgcolor=#E9E9E9
| 334816 ||  || — || September 16, 2003 || Socorro || LINEAR || — || align=right | 1.5 km || 
|-id=817 bgcolor=#E9E9E9
| 334817 ||  || — || September 17, 2003 || Kitt Peak || Spacewatch || WIT || align=right | 1.3 km || 
|-id=818 bgcolor=#d6d6d6
| 334818 ||  || — || September 16, 2003 || Kitt Peak || Spacewatch || — || align=right | 3.4 km || 
|-id=819 bgcolor=#E9E9E9
| 334819 ||  || — || September 19, 2003 || Palomar || NEAT || — || align=right | 2.5 km || 
|-id=820 bgcolor=#E9E9E9
| 334820 ||  || — || September 20, 2003 || Socorro || LINEAR || — || align=right | 2.6 km || 
|-id=821 bgcolor=#E9E9E9
| 334821 ||  || — || September 21, 2003 || Kitt Peak || Spacewatch || — || align=right | 2.2 km || 
|-id=822 bgcolor=#E9E9E9
| 334822 ||  || — || September 22, 2003 || Anderson Mesa || LONEOS || DOR || align=right | 3.2 km || 
|-id=823 bgcolor=#E9E9E9
| 334823 ||  || — || September 26, 2003 || Apache Point || SDSS || GEF || align=right | 1.5 km || 
|-id=824 bgcolor=#d6d6d6
| 334824 ||  || — || September 26, 2003 || Apache Point || SDSS || — || align=right | 3.1 km || 
|-id=825 bgcolor=#d6d6d6
| 334825 ||  || — || September 26, 2003 || Apache Point || SDSS || EOS || align=right | 2.3 km || 
|-id=826 bgcolor=#E9E9E9
| 334826 ||  || — || September 27, 2003 || Apache Point || SDSS || RAF || align=right | 1.1 km || 
|-id=827 bgcolor=#E9E9E9
| 334827 ||  || — || September 17, 2003 || Kitt Peak || Spacewatch || AGN || align=right | 1.1 km || 
|-id=828 bgcolor=#E9E9E9
| 334828 ||  || — || September 18, 2003 || Palomar || NEAT || — || align=right | 1.6 km || 
|-id=829 bgcolor=#E9E9E9
| 334829 ||  || — || September 26, 2003 || Apache Point || SDSS || — || align=right | 2.8 km || 
|-id=830 bgcolor=#E9E9E9
| 334830 ||  || — || September 26, 2003 || Apache Point || SDSS || — || align=right | 1.0 km || 
|-id=831 bgcolor=#E9E9E9
| 334831 ||  || — || September 26, 2003 || Apache Point || SDSS || — || align=right | 1.9 km || 
|-id=832 bgcolor=#d6d6d6
| 334832 ||  || — || September 26, 2003 || Apache Point || SDSS || — || align=right | 3.7 km || 
|-id=833 bgcolor=#E9E9E9
| 334833 ||  || — || September 28, 2003 || Apache Point || SDSS || — || align=right | 1.9 km || 
|-id=834 bgcolor=#E9E9E9
| 334834 ||  || — || September 18, 2003 || Kitt Peak || Spacewatch || GEF || align=right | 1.6 km || 
|-id=835 bgcolor=#E9E9E9
| 334835 ||  || — || October 1, 2003 || Kitt Peak || Spacewatch || MRX || align=right | 1.4 km || 
|-id=836 bgcolor=#E9E9E9
| 334836 ||  || — || October 15, 2003 || Socorro || LINEAR || — || align=right | 3.3 km || 
|-id=837 bgcolor=#E9E9E9
| 334837 ||  || — || October 14, 2003 || Palomar || NEAT || — || align=right | 2.6 km || 
|-id=838 bgcolor=#E9E9E9
| 334838 ||  || — || October 1, 2003 || Kitt Peak || Spacewatch || — || align=right | 2.5 km || 
|-id=839 bgcolor=#E9E9E9
| 334839 ||  || — || October 1, 2003 || Kitt Peak || Spacewatch || — || align=right | 2.2 km || 
|-id=840 bgcolor=#E9E9E9
| 334840 ||  || — || October 1, 2003 || Kitt Peak || Spacewatch || — || align=right | 2.2 km || 
|-id=841 bgcolor=#E9E9E9
| 334841 ||  || — || October 1, 2003 || Anderson Mesa || LONEOS || — || align=right | 2.8 km || 
|-id=842 bgcolor=#d6d6d6
| 334842 ||  || — || October 5, 2003 || Kitt Peak || Spacewatch || — || align=right | 2.5 km || 
|-id=843 bgcolor=#E9E9E9
| 334843 ||  || — || October 5, 2003 || Kitt Peak || Spacewatch || MRX || align=right | 1.3 km || 
|-id=844 bgcolor=#E9E9E9
| 334844 ||  || — || October 16, 2003 || Kitt Peak || Spacewatch || AGN || align=right | 1.3 km || 
|-id=845 bgcolor=#E9E9E9
| 334845 ||  || — || October 17, 2003 || Kitt Peak || Spacewatch || — || align=right | 2.6 km || 
|-id=846 bgcolor=#fefefe
| 334846 ||  || — || October 16, 2003 || Kitt Peak || Spacewatch || V || align=right data-sort-value="0.82" | 820 m || 
|-id=847 bgcolor=#E9E9E9
| 334847 ||  || — || October 16, 2003 || Kitt Peak || Spacewatch || — || align=right | 2.0 km || 
|-id=848 bgcolor=#E9E9E9
| 334848 ||  || — || October 17, 2003 || Kitt Peak || Spacewatch || AST || align=right | 1.9 km || 
|-id=849 bgcolor=#d6d6d6
| 334849 ||  || — || October 18, 2003 || Kitt Peak || Spacewatch || — || align=right | 2.2 km || 
|-id=850 bgcolor=#E9E9E9
| 334850 ||  || — || October 16, 2003 || Palomar || NEAT || INO || align=right | 1.8 km || 
|-id=851 bgcolor=#E9E9E9
| 334851 ||  || — || October 17, 2003 || Kitt Peak || Spacewatch || — || align=right | 3.9 km || 
|-id=852 bgcolor=#E9E9E9
| 334852 ||  || — || October 18, 2003 || Palomar || NEAT || DOR || align=right | 4.3 km || 
|-id=853 bgcolor=#E9E9E9
| 334853 ||  || — || October 16, 2003 || Palomar || NEAT || — || align=right | 3.0 km || 
|-id=854 bgcolor=#E9E9E9
| 334854 ||  || — || October 17, 2003 || Anderson Mesa || LONEOS || — || align=right | 2.7 km || 
|-id=855 bgcolor=#E9E9E9
| 334855 ||  || — || October 18, 2003 || Haleakala || NEAT || RAF || align=right | 1.2 km || 
|-id=856 bgcolor=#d6d6d6
| 334856 ||  || — || October 19, 2003 || Anderson Mesa || LONEOS || — || align=right | 3.1 km || 
|-id=857 bgcolor=#d6d6d6
| 334857 ||  || — || October 17, 2003 || Anderson Mesa || LONEOS || — || align=right | 2.7 km || 
|-id=858 bgcolor=#d6d6d6
| 334858 ||  || — || October 18, 2003 || Palomar || NEAT || — || align=right | 3.3 km || 
|-id=859 bgcolor=#E9E9E9
| 334859 ||  || — || October 20, 2003 || Socorro || LINEAR || — || align=right | 3.0 km || 
|-id=860 bgcolor=#d6d6d6
| 334860 ||  || — || October 21, 2003 || Socorro || LINEAR || — || align=right | 3.2 km || 
|-id=861 bgcolor=#E9E9E9
| 334861 ||  || — || October 19, 2003 || Palomar || NEAT || WAT || align=right | 2.9 km || 
|-id=862 bgcolor=#E9E9E9
| 334862 ||  || — || October 20, 2003 || Socorro || LINEAR || — || align=right | 3.4 km || 
|-id=863 bgcolor=#d6d6d6
| 334863 ||  || — || October 19, 2003 || Palomar || NEAT || HIL || align=right | 6.0 km || 
|-id=864 bgcolor=#E9E9E9
| 334864 ||  || — || October 21, 2003 || Socorro || LINEAR || — || align=right | 2.9 km || 
|-id=865 bgcolor=#d6d6d6
| 334865 ||  || — || October 18, 2003 || Anderson Mesa || LONEOS || BRA || align=right | 1.7 km || 
|-id=866 bgcolor=#E9E9E9
| 334866 ||  || — || October 18, 2003 || Anderson Mesa || LONEOS || — || align=right | 2.7 km || 
|-id=867 bgcolor=#E9E9E9
| 334867 ||  || — || October 20, 2003 || Kitt Peak || Spacewatch || AGN || align=right | 1.4 km || 
|-id=868 bgcolor=#E9E9E9
| 334868 ||  || — || October 21, 2003 || Socorro || LINEAR || — || align=right | 3.8 km || 
|-id=869 bgcolor=#E9E9E9
| 334869 ||  || — || October 21, 2003 || Socorro || LINEAR || — || align=right | 3.4 km || 
|-id=870 bgcolor=#E9E9E9
| 334870 ||  || — || October 21, 2003 || Socorro || LINEAR || — || align=right | 2.7 km || 
|-id=871 bgcolor=#E9E9E9
| 334871 ||  || — || October 20, 2003 || Socorro || LINEAR || — || align=right | 3.2 km || 
|-id=872 bgcolor=#E9E9E9
| 334872 ||  || — || October 20, 2003 || Kitt Peak || Spacewatch || HOF || align=right | 2.7 km || 
|-id=873 bgcolor=#d6d6d6
| 334873 ||  || — || October 21, 2003 || Kitt Peak || Spacewatch || — || align=right | 4.0 km || 
|-id=874 bgcolor=#d6d6d6
| 334874 ||  || — || October 23, 2003 || Haleakala || NEAT || SAN || align=right | 2.0 km || 
|-id=875 bgcolor=#d6d6d6
| 334875 ||  || — || October 22, 2003 || Kitt Peak || Spacewatch || — || align=right | 3.4 km || 
|-id=876 bgcolor=#E9E9E9
| 334876 ||  || — || October 23, 2003 || Anderson Mesa || LONEOS || MRX || align=right | 1.2 km || 
|-id=877 bgcolor=#E9E9E9
| 334877 ||  || — || October 24, 2003 || Socorro || LINEAR || MRX || align=right | 1.2 km || 
|-id=878 bgcolor=#E9E9E9
| 334878 ||  || — || October 24, 2003 || Socorro || LINEAR || — || align=right | 3.3 km || 
|-id=879 bgcolor=#d6d6d6
| 334879 ||  || — || October 25, 2003 || Anderson Mesa || LONEOS || — || align=right | 4.8 km || 
|-id=880 bgcolor=#d6d6d6
| 334880 ||  || — || October 23, 2003 || Kitt Peak || M. W. Buie || — || align=right | 3.1 km || 
|-id=881 bgcolor=#E9E9E9
| 334881 ||  || — || October 17, 2003 || Kitt Peak || Spacewatch || — || align=right | 1.0 km || 
|-id=882 bgcolor=#d6d6d6
| 334882 ||  || — || October 19, 2003 || Kitt Peak || Spacewatch || — || align=right | 2.7 km || 
|-id=883 bgcolor=#d6d6d6
| 334883 ||  || — || October 24, 2003 || Kitt Peak || M. W. Buie || — || align=right | 2.2 km || 
|-id=884 bgcolor=#E9E9E9
| 334884 ||  || — || October 22, 2003 || Apache Point || SDSS || — || align=right | 2.4 km || 
|-id=885 bgcolor=#E9E9E9
| 334885 ||  || — || October 16, 2003 || Kitt Peak || Spacewatch || HOF || align=right | 2.7 km || 
|-id=886 bgcolor=#E9E9E9
| 334886 ||  || — || March 24, 2001 || Kitt Peak || Spacewatch || AGN || align=right | 1.6 km || 
|-id=887 bgcolor=#E9E9E9
| 334887 ||  || — || October 17, 2003 || Apache Point || SDSS || WIT || align=right | 1.1 km || 
|-id=888 bgcolor=#E9E9E9
| 334888 ||  || — || October 19, 2003 || Apache Point || SDSS || — || align=right | 2.5 km || 
|-id=889 bgcolor=#E9E9E9
| 334889 ||  || — || October 19, 2003 || Apache Point || SDSS || — || align=right | 2.2 km || 
|-id=890 bgcolor=#E9E9E9
| 334890 ||  || — || October 22, 2003 || Apache Point || SDSS || — || align=right | 2.1 km || 
|-id=891 bgcolor=#E9E9E9
| 334891 ||  || — || November 2, 2003 || Socorro || LINEAR || — || align=right | 3.6 km || 
|-id=892 bgcolor=#d6d6d6
| 334892 ||  || — || November 16, 2003 || Kitt Peak || Spacewatch || EOS || align=right | 2.2 km || 
|-id=893 bgcolor=#d6d6d6
| 334893 ||  || — || November 18, 2003 || Palomar || NEAT || — || align=right | 2.7 km || 
|-id=894 bgcolor=#E9E9E9
| 334894 ||  || — || November 21, 2003 || Catalina || CSS || GER || align=right | 2.0 km || 
|-id=895 bgcolor=#fefefe
| 334895 ||  || — || November 19, 2003 || Socorro || LINEAR || H || align=right | 1.2 km || 
|-id=896 bgcolor=#d6d6d6
| 334896 ||  || — || November 19, 2003 || Kitt Peak || Spacewatch || — || align=right | 3.6 km || 
|-id=897 bgcolor=#d6d6d6
| 334897 ||  || — || November 19, 2003 || Kitt Peak || Spacewatch || — || align=right | 2.8 km || 
|-id=898 bgcolor=#d6d6d6
| 334898 ||  || — || November 20, 2003 || Socorro || LINEAR || — || align=right | 4.5 km || 
|-id=899 bgcolor=#d6d6d6
| 334899 ||  || — || November 20, 2003 || Kitt Peak || Spacewatch || — || align=right | 2.5 km || 
|-id=900 bgcolor=#d6d6d6
| 334900 ||  || — || November 16, 2003 || Kitt Peak || Spacewatch || — || align=right | 3.7 km || 
|}

334901–335000 

|-bgcolor=#d6d6d6
| 334901 ||  || — || November 19, 2003 || Anderson Mesa || LONEOS || — || align=right | 3.2 km || 
|-id=902 bgcolor=#E9E9E9
| 334902 ||  || — || November 22, 2003 || Kitt Peak || Spacewatch || — || align=right | 2.5 km || 
|-id=903 bgcolor=#fefefe
| 334903 ||  || — || November 19, 2003 || Catalina || CSS || — || align=right | 1.4 km || 
|-id=904 bgcolor=#E9E9E9
| 334904 ||  || — || November 19, 2003 || Palomar || NEAT || fast? || align=right | 2.4 km || 
|-id=905 bgcolor=#d6d6d6
| 334905 ||  || — || November 19, 2003 || Palomar || NEAT || — || align=right | 3.8 km || 
|-id=906 bgcolor=#d6d6d6
| 334906 ||  || — || November 23, 2003 || Kitt Peak || M. W. Buie || — || align=right | 2.4 km || 
|-id=907 bgcolor=#E9E9E9
| 334907 ||  || — || December 3, 2003 || Anderson Mesa || LONEOS || PAE || align=right | 3.6 km || 
|-id=908 bgcolor=#fefefe
| 334908 ||  || — || December 3, 2003 || Socorro || LINEAR || — || align=right | 1.8 km || 
|-id=909 bgcolor=#fefefe
| 334909 ||  || — || November 30, 2003 || Kitt Peak || Spacewatch || V || align=right data-sort-value="0.67" | 670 m || 
|-id=910 bgcolor=#d6d6d6
| 334910 ||  || — || December 19, 2003 || Kingsnake || J. V. McClusky || — || align=right | 5.0 km || 
|-id=911 bgcolor=#fefefe
| 334911 ||  || — || December 19, 2003 || Socorro || LINEAR || H || align=right data-sort-value="0.73" | 730 m || 
|-id=912 bgcolor=#fefefe
| 334912 ||  || — || December 17, 2003 || Socorro || LINEAR || — || align=right | 1.0 km || 
|-id=913 bgcolor=#d6d6d6
| 334913 ||  || — || December 17, 2003 || Socorro || LINEAR || ALA || align=right | 3.9 km || 
|-id=914 bgcolor=#d6d6d6
| 334914 ||  || — || December 17, 2003 || Anderson Mesa || LONEOS || EUP || align=right | 5.9 km || 
|-id=915 bgcolor=#E9E9E9
| 334915 ||  || — || December 16, 2003 || Kitt Peak || Spacewatch || GEF || align=right | 1.8 km || 
|-id=916 bgcolor=#fefefe
| 334916 ||  || — || December 19, 2003 || Kitt Peak || Spacewatch || — || align=right data-sort-value="0.71" | 710 m || 
|-id=917 bgcolor=#d6d6d6
| 334917 ||  || — || December 19, 2003 || Kitt Peak || Spacewatch || — || align=right | 3.7 km || 
|-id=918 bgcolor=#d6d6d6
| 334918 ||  || — || December 19, 2003 || Kitt Peak || Spacewatch || — || align=right | 3.0 km || 
|-id=919 bgcolor=#d6d6d6
| 334919 ||  || — || December 21, 2003 || Socorro || LINEAR || — || align=right | 2.9 km || 
|-id=920 bgcolor=#d6d6d6
| 334920 ||  || — || December 25, 2003 || Haleakala || NEAT || LAU || align=right | 1.2 km || 
|-id=921 bgcolor=#E9E9E9
| 334921 ||  || — || December 27, 2003 || Kitt Peak || Spacewatch || GER || align=right | 1.9 km || 
|-id=922 bgcolor=#d6d6d6
| 334922 ||  || — || December 28, 2003 || Socorro || LINEAR || — || align=right | 3.6 km || 
|-id=923 bgcolor=#d6d6d6
| 334923 ||  || — || December 28, 2003 || Socorro || LINEAR || — || align=right | 4.2 km || 
|-id=924 bgcolor=#E9E9E9
| 334924 ||  || — || December 28, 2003 || Socorro || LINEAR || — || align=right | 1.4 km || 
|-id=925 bgcolor=#E9E9E9
| 334925 ||  || — || December 28, 2003 || Socorro || LINEAR || — || align=right | 3.1 km || 
|-id=926 bgcolor=#d6d6d6
| 334926 ||  || — || January 14, 2004 || Palomar || NEAT || — || align=right | 4.1 km || 
|-id=927 bgcolor=#d6d6d6
| 334927 ||  || — || January 15, 2004 || Kitt Peak || Spacewatch || — || align=right | 2.9 km || 
|-id=928 bgcolor=#d6d6d6
| 334928 ||  || — || January 15, 2004 || Kitt Peak || Spacewatch || VER || align=right | 3.3 km || 
|-id=929 bgcolor=#d6d6d6
| 334929 ||  || — || January 16, 2004 || Palomar || NEAT || EOS || align=right | 3.2 km || 
|-id=930 bgcolor=#d6d6d6
| 334930 ||  || — || January 17, 2004 || Palomar || NEAT || — || align=right | 2.9 km || 
|-id=931 bgcolor=#d6d6d6
| 334931 ||  || — || January 18, 2004 || Palomar || NEAT || — || align=right | 3.6 km || 
|-id=932 bgcolor=#fefefe
| 334932 ||  || — || January 19, 2004 || Kitt Peak || Spacewatch || — || align=right | 1.0 km || 
|-id=933 bgcolor=#d6d6d6
| 334933 ||  || — || January 19, 2004 || Kitt Peak || Spacewatch || — || align=right | 4.6 km || 
|-id=934 bgcolor=#d6d6d6
| 334934 ||  || — || January 21, 2004 || Kitt Peak || Spacewatch || — || align=right | 4.3 km || 
|-id=935 bgcolor=#d6d6d6
| 334935 ||  || — || January 21, 2004 || Socorro || LINEAR || ALA || align=right | 3.4 km || 
|-id=936 bgcolor=#E9E9E9
| 334936 ||  || — || January 22, 2004 || Socorro || LINEAR || ADE || align=right | 2.0 km || 
|-id=937 bgcolor=#fefefe
| 334937 ||  || — || January 22, 2004 || Socorro || LINEAR || — || align=right | 1.1 km || 
|-id=938 bgcolor=#d6d6d6
| 334938 ||  || — || January 22, 2004 || Socorro || LINEAR || — || align=right | 4.5 km || 
|-id=939 bgcolor=#d6d6d6
| 334939 ||  || — || January 23, 2004 || Socorro || LINEAR || — || align=right | 4.9 km || 
|-id=940 bgcolor=#fefefe
| 334940 ||  || — || January 27, 2004 || Kitt Peak || Spacewatch || V || align=right data-sort-value="0.72" | 720 m || 
|-id=941 bgcolor=#d6d6d6
| 334941 ||  || — || January 24, 2004 || Socorro || LINEAR || — || align=right | 3.3 km || 
|-id=942 bgcolor=#d6d6d6
| 334942 ||  || — || January 28, 2004 || Catalina || CSS || — || align=right | 5.2 km || 
|-id=943 bgcolor=#d6d6d6
| 334943 ||  || — || January 23, 2004 || Socorro || LINEAR || — || align=right | 4.8 km || 
|-id=944 bgcolor=#d6d6d6
| 334944 ||  || — || January 29, 2004 || Anderson Mesa || LONEOS || — || align=right | 3.7 km || 
|-id=945 bgcolor=#fefefe
| 334945 ||  || — || January 28, 2004 || Kitt Peak || Spacewatch || FLO || align=right data-sort-value="0.80" | 800 m || 
|-id=946 bgcolor=#fefefe
| 334946 ||  || — || February 11, 2004 || Kitt Peak || Spacewatch || — || align=right | 1.0 km || 
|-id=947 bgcolor=#FA8072
| 334947 ||  || — || February 11, 2004 || Kitt Peak || Spacewatch || — || align=right | 1.3 km || 
|-id=948 bgcolor=#d6d6d6
| 334948 ||  || — || February 11, 2004 || Palomar || NEAT || — || align=right | 3.9 km || 
|-id=949 bgcolor=#d6d6d6
| 334949 ||  || — || February 12, 2004 || Kitt Peak || Spacewatch || — || align=right | 3.7 km || 
|-id=950 bgcolor=#d6d6d6
| 334950 ||  || — || February 11, 2004 || Palomar || NEAT || — || align=right | 4.2 km || 
|-id=951 bgcolor=#fefefe
| 334951 ||  || — || January 30, 2004 || Kitt Peak || Spacewatch || — || align=right data-sort-value="0.83" | 830 m || 
|-id=952 bgcolor=#d6d6d6
| 334952 ||  || — || February 11, 2004 || Kitt Peak || Spacewatch || — || align=right | 3.4 km || 
|-id=953 bgcolor=#d6d6d6
| 334953 ||  || — || February 12, 2004 || Kitt Peak || Spacewatch || EOS || align=right | 2.9 km || 
|-id=954 bgcolor=#d6d6d6
| 334954 ||  || — || February 13, 2004 || Palomar || NEAT || URS || align=right | 4.2 km || 
|-id=955 bgcolor=#FA8072
| 334955 ||  || — || February 13, 2004 || Palomar || NEAT || — || align=right data-sort-value="0.70" | 700 m || 
|-id=956 bgcolor=#fefefe
| 334956 ||  || — || February 14, 2004 || Kitt Peak || Spacewatch || — || align=right | 1.1 km || 
|-id=957 bgcolor=#fefefe
| 334957 ||  || — || February 13, 2004 || Kitt Peak || Spacewatch || PHO || align=right | 3.1 km || 
|-id=958 bgcolor=#E9E9E9
| 334958 ||  || — || February 10, 2004 || Palomar || NEAT || — || align=right | 2.9 km || 
|-id=959 bgcolor=#d6d6d6
| 334959 ||  || — || February 11, 2004 || Anderson Mesa || LONEOS || — || align=right | 4.4 km || 
|-id=960 bgcolor=#d6d6d6
| 334960 ||  || — || February 12, 2004 || Kitt Peak || Spacewatch || — || align=right | 5.0 km || 
|-id=961 bgcolor=#d6d6d6
| 334961 ||  || — || February 13, 2004 || Kitt Peak || Spacewatch || URS || align=right | 4.2 km || 
|-id=962 bgcolor=#fefefe
| 334962 ||  || — || February 16, 2004 || Kitt Peak || Spacewatch || — || align=right data-sort-value="0.87" | 870 m || 
|-id=963 bgcolor=#fefefe
| 334963 ||  || — || February 18, 2004 || Kitt Peak || Spacewatch || — || align=right | 1.0 km || 
|-id=964 bgcolor=#fefefe
| 334964 ||  || — || February 23, 2004 || Socorro || LINEAR || — || align=right data-sort-value="0.83" | 830 m || 
|-id=965 bgcolor=#d6d6d6
| 334965 ||  || — || February 22, 2004 || Kitt Peak || Spacewatch || — || align=right | 2.8 km || 
|-id=966 bgcolor=#fefefe
| 334966 ||  || — || February 23, 2004 || Socorro || LINEAR || V || align=right data-sort-value="0.74" | 740 m || 
|-id=967 bgcolor=#fefefe
| 334967 ||  || — || February 23, 2004 || Socorro || LINEAR || NYS || align=right data-sort-value="0.74" | 740 m || 
|-id=968 bgcolor=#fefefe
| 334968 ||  || — || February 18, 2004 || Socorro || LINEAR || FLO || align=right data-sort-value="0.83" | 830 m || 
|-id=969 bgcolor=#d6d6d6
| 334969 ||  || — || February 16, 2004 || Kitt Peak || Spacewatch || EUP || align=right | 5.4 km || 
|-id=970 bgcolor=#d6d6d6
| 334970 ||  || — || March 11, 2004 || Palomar || NEAT || — || align=right | 3.7 km || 
|-id=971 bgcolor=#fefefe
| 334971 ||  || — || March 13, 2004 || Palomar || NEAT || ERI || align=right | 1.8 km || 
|-id=972 bgcolor=#fefefe
| 334972 ||  || — || March 14, 2004 || Kitt Peak || Spacewatch || — || align=right | 1.1 km || 
|-id=973 bgcolor=#d6d6d6
| 334973 ||  || — || March 15, 2004 || Kitt Peak || Spacewatch || — || align=right | 3.5 km || 
|-id=974 bgcolor=#fefefe
| 334974 ||  || — || March 12, 2004 || Palomar || NEAT || V || align=right data-sort-value="0.92" | 920 m || 
|-id=975 bgcolor=#fefefe
| 334975 ||  || — || March 15, 2004 || Kitt Peak || Spacewatch || — || align=right data-sort-value="0.76" | 760 m || 
|-id=976 bgcolor=#fefefe
| 334976 ||  || — || March 14, 2004 || Kitt Peak || Spacewatch || H || align=right data-sort-value="0.55" | 550 m || 
|-id=977 bgcolor=#fefefe
| 334977 ||  || — || March 15, 2004 || Junk Bond || Junk Bond Obs. || — || align=right | 1.6 km || 
|-id=978 bgcolor=#d6d6d6
| 334978 ||  || — || March 14, 2004 || Socorro || LINEAR || — || align=right | 4.6 km || 
|-id=979 bgcolor=#fefefe
| 334979 ||  || — || March 15, 2004 || Socorro || LINEAR || — || align=right | 1.3 km || 
|-id=980 bgcolor=#d6d6d6
| 334980 ||  || — || March 16, 2004 || Socorro || LINEAR || — || align=right | 3.6 km || 
|-id=981 bgcolor=#fefefe
| 334981 ||  || — || March 16, 2004 || Catalina || CSS || PHO || align=right | 1.6 km || 
|-id=982 bgcolor=#fefefe
| 334982 ||  || — || March 16, 2004 || Catalina || CSS || — || align=right | 1.2 km || 
|-id=983 bgcolor=#fefefe
| 334983 ||  || — || March 27, 2004 || Goodricke-Pigott || R. A. Tucker || — || align=right | 1.2 km || 
|-id=984 bgcolor=#fefefe
| 334984 ||  || — || March 16, 2004 || Socorro || LINEAR || — || align=right | 1.0 km || 
|-id=985 bgcolor=#fefefe
| 334985 ||  || — || March 18, 2004 || Socorro || LINEAR || — || align=right data-sort-value="0.88" | 880 m || 
|-id=986 bgcolor=#fefefe
| 334986 ||  || — || March 18, 2004 || Socorro || LINEAR || NYS || align=right data-sort-value="0.76" | 760 m || 
|-id=987 bgcolor=#fefefe
| 334987 ||  || — || March 20, 2004 || Socorro || LINEAR || FLO || align=right data-sort-value="0.67" | 670 m || 
|-id=988 bgcolor=#fefefe
| 334988 ||  || — || March 20, 2004 || Socorro || LINEAR || — || align=right | 1.0 km || 
|-id=989 bgcolor=#fefefe
| 334989 ||  || — || March 20, 2004 || Socorro || LINEAR || — || align=right data-sort-value="0.84" | 840 m || 
|-id=990 bgcolor=#fefefe
| 334990 ||  || — || March 18, 2004 || Socorro || LINEAR || — || align=right data-sort-value="0.77" | 770 m || 
|-id=991 bgcolor=#d6d6d6
| 334991 ||  || — || March 23, 2004 || Socorro || LINEAR || — || align=right | 4.6 km || 
|-id=992 bgcolor=#fefefe
| 334992 ||  || — || March 26, 2004 || Socorro || LINEAR || KLI || align=right | 2.7 km || 
|-id=993 bgcolor=#d6d6d6
| 334993 ||  || — || March 26, 2004 || Kitt Peak || Spacewatch || — || align=right | 3.9 km || 
|-id=994 bgcolor=#d6d6d6
| 334994 ||  || — || March 27, 2004 || Kitt Peak || Spacewatch || — || align=right | 4.0 km || 
|-id=995 bgcolor=#d6d6d6
| 334995 ||  || — || March 18, 2004 || Socorro || LINEAR || URS || align=right | 4.3 km || 
|-id=996 bgcolor=#fefefe
| 334996 ||  || — || March 27, 2004 || Socorro || LINEAR || — || align=right | 1.0 km || 
|-id=997 bgcolor=#fefefe
| 334997 ||  || — || April 12, 2004 || Anderson Mesa || LONEOS || FLOfast? || align=right data-sort-value="0.85" | 850 m || 
|-id=998 bgcolor=#fefefe
| 334998 ||  || — || April 12, 2004 || Anderson Mesa || LONEOS || NYS || align=right data-sort-value="0.66" | 660 m || 
|-id=999 bgcolor=#FA8072
| 334999 ||  || — || April 14, 2004 || Anderson Mesa || LONEOS || H || align=right | 1.1 km || 
|-id=000 bgcolor=#fefefe
| 335000 ||  || — || April 15, 2004 || Anderson Mesa || LONEOS || ERI || align=right | 2.1 km || 
|}

References

External links 
 Discovery Circumstances: Numbered Minor Planets (330001)–(335000) (IAU Minor Planet Center)

0334